= Mecklenburg-Vorpommern =

State in Germany

Mecklenburg-Vorpommern Mäkelborg-Vörpommern (Low German)
- State
- Flag Coat of arms
- Interactive map of Mecklenburg-Vorpommern
- Coordinates: 53°45′N 12°30′E
- Country: Germany
- Capital: Schwerin
- Largest city: Rostock

Government
  - Body: Landtag of Mecklenburg-Vorpommern
  - Minister-President: Manuela Schwesig (SPD)
  - Governing parties: SPD / The Left / Greens
  - Bundesrat votes: 3 (of 69)
  - Bundestag seats: 13 (of 630) (as of 2025)

Area
  - Total: 23,294.90 km^{2} (8,994.21 sq mi)

Population (2023-12-31)
  - Total: 1,629,464
  - Density: 69.94939/km^{2} (181.1681/sq mi)

GDP
  - Total: €63.585 billion (2025)
  - Per capita: €40,407 (2025)
- Time zone: UTC+1 (CET)
  - Summer (DST): UTC+2 (CEST)
- ISO 3166 code: DE-MV
- Vehicle registration: formerly: MP (1945–1947), SM (1948–1953)
- NUTS Region: DEF
- HDI (2022): 0.922 very high · 15th of 16
- Website: Mecklenburg-Vorpommern.de

Mecklenburg-Vorpommern (MV; German: [ˌmeːklənbʊʁkˈfoːɐ̯pɔmɐn] or [ˌmɛk-]; Low German: Mäkelborg-Vörpommern), often known by its anglicised name Mecklenburg–West Pomerania, is a coastal state in the north-east of Germany. Of the country's sixteen states, Mecklenburg-Vorpommern ranks 14th in population; it covers an area of 23,300 km^{2} (9,000 sq mi), making it the sixth largest German state in area; and it is 16th in population density. Schwerin is the state capital and Rostock is the largest city. Other major cities include Neubrandenburg, Stralsund, Greifswald, Wismar, and Güstrow. It was named after the two regions of Mecklenburg and Western Pomerania (German: Vorpommern).

The state was established in 1945 after World War II through the merger of the historic regions of Mecklenburg and Prussian Western Pomerania by the Soviet military administration in Allied-occupied Germany. It became part of the German Democratic Republic in 1949, but was dissolved in 1952 during administrative reforms and its territory divided into the districts of Rostock, Schwerin, and Neubrandenburg. Mecklenburg-Vorpommern was re-established in 1990 following German reunification and became one of the new states of the Federal Republic of Germany. Mecklenburg-Vorpommern has land borders with Poland and the German states of Brandenburg, Lower Saxony, and Schleswig-Holstein.

On the state's coastline on the Baltic Sea are many holiday resorts and much unspoilt nature, including the islands of Rügen, Usedom, and others, as well as the Mecklenburg Lake District, making the state one of Germany's leading tourist destinations. Three of Germany's fourteen national parks, as well as several hundred nature conservation areas, are in the state. The University of Rostock, founded in 1419, and the University of Greifswald, established in 1456, are among the oldest universities in Europe. In 2007, the 33rd G8 summit took place at the Grand Hotel Heiligendamm on the Mecklenburg Baltic coast during the chancellorship of Angela Merkel, who represented various constituencies of Mecklenburg-Vorpommern in the national legislature, the Bundestag.

== Name ==
Due to its lengthy name, the state is often abbreviated as MV or (colloquially) shortened to MeckPomm. In English, it is usually called "Mecklenburg–West Pomerania" or less frequently "Mecklenburg–Cispomerania." Inhabitants are called either Mecklenburger or Pomeranians; the combined form is never used.

The place name Vorpommern derives from West Slavic languages. The prefix "po-" means along or at, and the base word "more" means sea, so that together "po more" means Land at the Sea. The German prefix "vor-" denotes a closer location; from the German point of view, this is the near part of Pomerania.

The full name in German is pronounced [ˈmeːklənbʊʁk ˈfoːɐ̯pɔmɐn]. Sometimes, Mecklenburg is pronounced [ˈmɛklənbʊʁk], because the digraph ⟨ck⟩ marks a preceding short vowel in High German. However, Mecklenburg is within the historical Low German language area, and the ⟨c⟩ appeared in its name during the period of transition to Standard, High German usage (Low German authors wrote the name Meklenborg or Męklenborg, depicting proper Low German pronunciation, which itself was a syncope of Middle Low German Mekelenborg). The introduction of the ⟨c⟩ is explained as follows: Either the ⟨c⟩ signals the stretched pronunciation of the preceding ⟨e⟩ (Dehnungs-c), or it signals the pronunciation of the subsequent ⟨k⟩ as an occlusive [k] to prevent it from falsely being rendered as a fricative [χ] following a Low German trend. Another explanation is that the ⟨c⟩ comes from a mannerism in High German officialese of writing unnecessary letters, a so-called Letternhäufelung (lit. 'letter accumulation', as was done sometimes in English with words such as "doubt").

== History ==
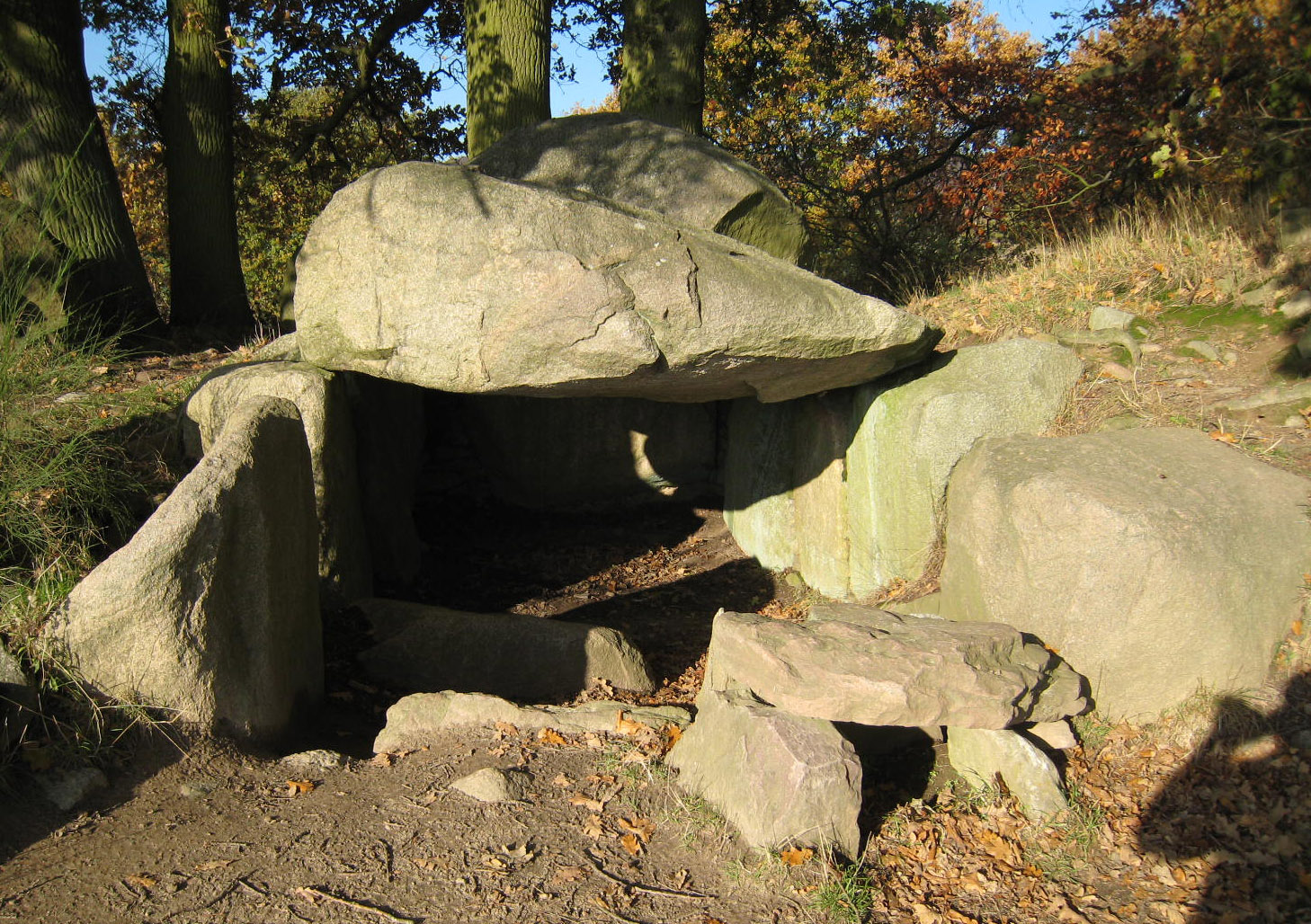
One of more than 1000 megalith sites in Mecklenburg-Vorpommern, the Lancken-Granitz dolmen

In the aftermath of the Second World War and German reunification in 1990, the state was constituted from the historic region of Mecklenburg and Western Pomerania, both of which had long and rich independent histories.

=== Prehistory ===
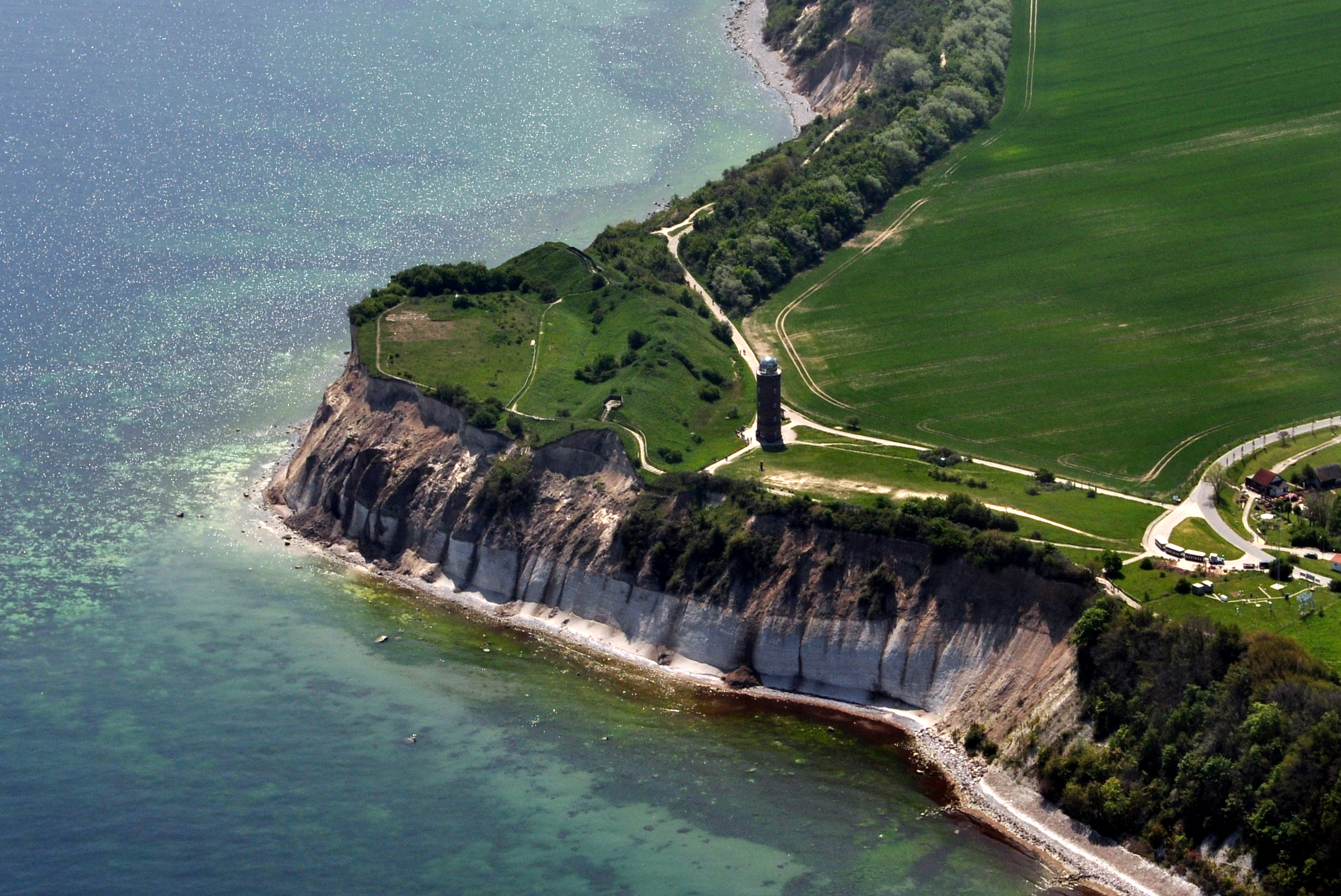
Slavic ring fortress at Cape Arkona, Rügen Island

Human settlement in the area of modern Mecklenburg and Vorpommern began after the Ice Age, about 10,000 BC. About two thousand years ago, Germanic peoples were recorded in the area. Most of them left during the Migration Period, heading towards Spain, Italy, and France, leaving the area relatively deserted. In the sixth century Polabian Slavs populated the area. While Mecklenburg was settled by the Obotrites, Pomerania was settled by the Veleti (later Liuticians) and the Rani.

Along the coast, Vikings and Slavs established trade posts like Reric, Ralswiek and Menzlin. In the early 12th century, Hither Pomerania passed under Polish suzerainty under Bolesław III Wrymouth, who initiated Christianization, entrusting this task to Otto of Bamberg. In the late 12th century, Mecklenburg and Hither Pomerania were conquered by Henry the Lion and briefly incorporated into the Duchy of Saxony, joining the Holy Roman Empire in the 1180s. Parts of Mecklenburg and Pomerania were settled with Germans in the Ostsiedlung process, starting in the 12th century.

=== Mecklenburg ===
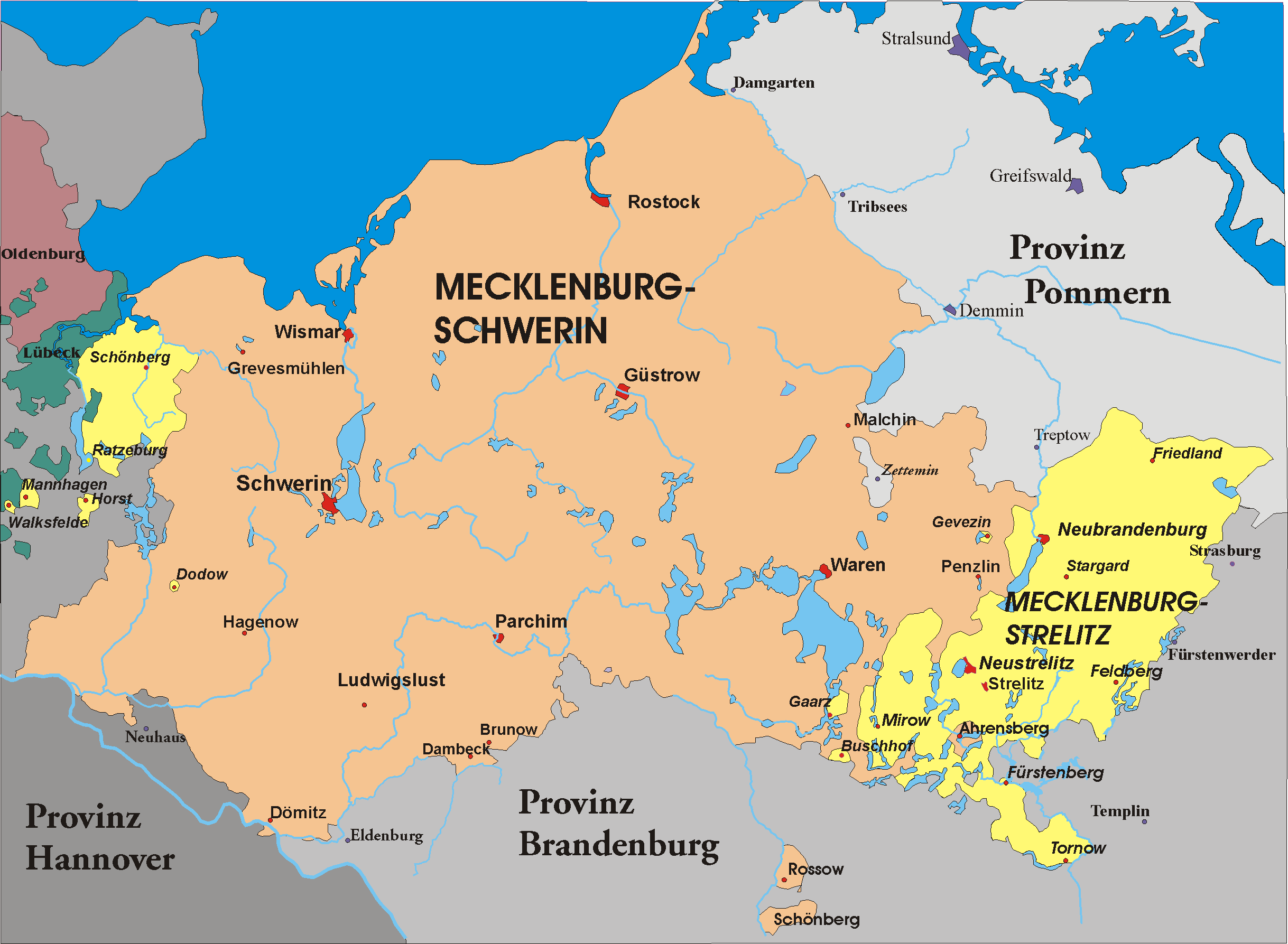
Mecklenburg from 1866 to 1934, with Mecklenburg-Schwerin and the small Mecklenburg-Strelitz

In the late 12th century, Henry the Lion, Duke of the Saxons, conquered the Obotrites, subjugated its Nikloting dynasty, and Christianized its people. In the course of time, German monks, nobility, peasants and traders arrived to settle here. After the 12th century, the territory remained stable and relatively independent of its neighbours; one of the few German territories for which this is true. Mecklenburg first became a duchy of the Holy Roman Empire in 1348. Though later partitioned and re-partitioned within the same dynasty, Mecklenburg always shared a common history and identity. The states of Mecklenburg-Schwerin and Mecklenburg-Strelitz became Grand Duchies in 1815, and in 1870 they voluntarily joined the new German Empire, while retaining their own internal autonomy. After the First World War and the abdication of the German Kaiser, the monarchies of the duchies were abolished and republican governments of both Mecklenburg states were established, until the Nazi government merged the two states into a unified state of Mecklenburg, a virtually meaningless administrative decision under the centralised regime.

=== Western Pomerania ===
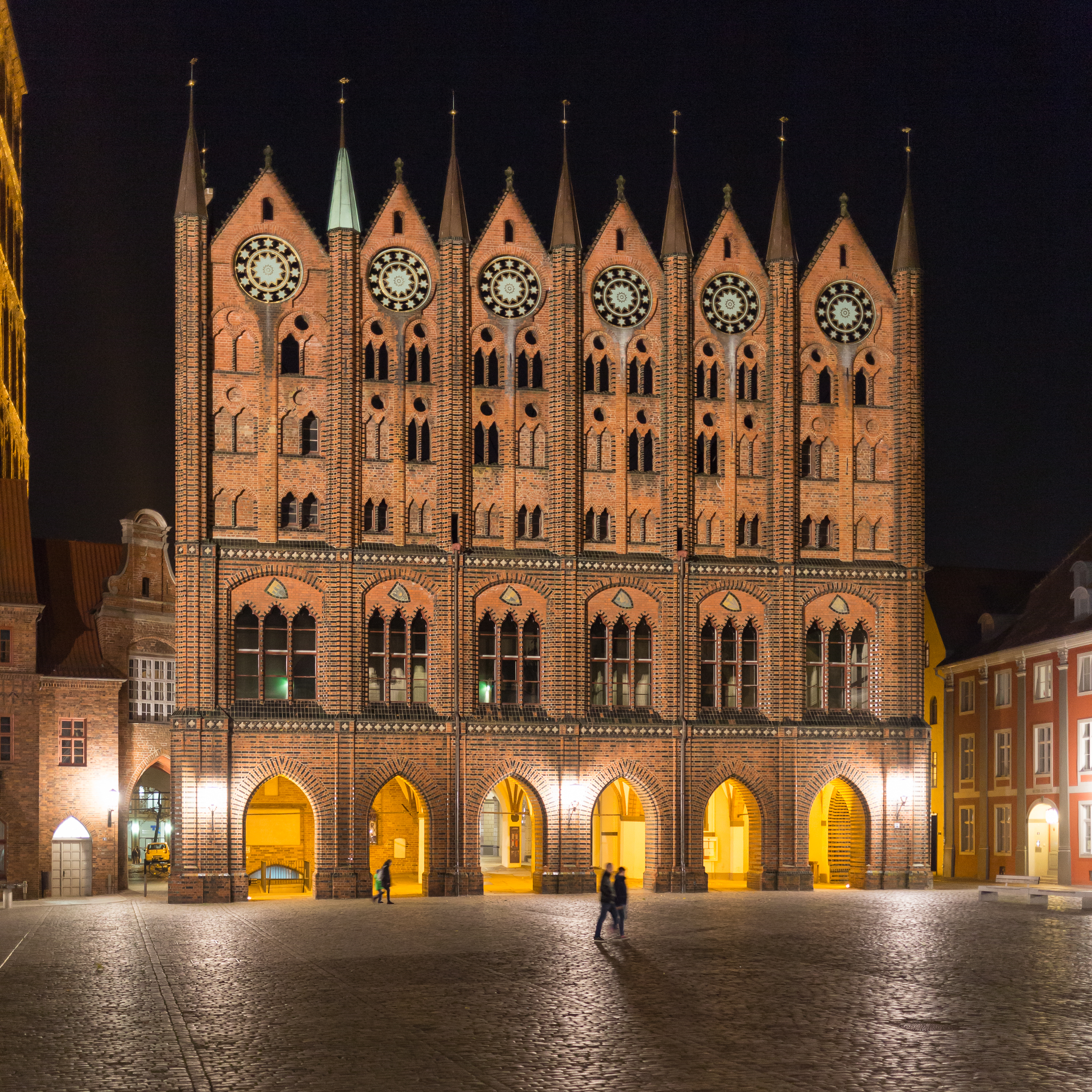
Late medieval Brick Gothic architecture in Stralsund, nowadays a UNESCO World Heritage Site

Vorpommern, literally Fore-Pomerania, is the smaller, western part of the former Prussian Province of Pomerania; the eastern part became part of Poland after the end of World War II.

Since the Middle Ages, the area was ruled by the Pomeranian dukes as part of the Duchy of Pomerania. The duchy was established as a vassal state of Poland in 1121, which it remained until 1138. Afterwards the Dukes of Pomerania were independent, and later were vassals of Saxony from 1164 to 1181, of the Holy Roman Empire from 1181 to 1185, of Denmark from 1185 to 1227 and finally, from 1227 on, staying with the Holy Roman Empire. Fore Pomerania was under Swedish rule after the Peace of Westphalia from 1648 until 1815 as Swedish Pomerania. It became a province of Prussia after the Congress of Vienna in 1815 and remained so until 1945.

=== Mecklenburg-Vorpommern ===
==== Wartime ====
In May 1945, the armies of the Soviet Union and the Western allies met east of Schwerin. Following the Potsdam Agreement, the Western allies handed over Mecklenburg to the Soviets. Mecklenburg-West Pomerania was established on 9 July 1945, by order No. 5 of Red Army Marshal Georgy Zhukov, head of the Soviet Military Administration in Germany (SMAD), as the Province of Mecklenburg and West Pomerania (zapadnoi Pomeranii).

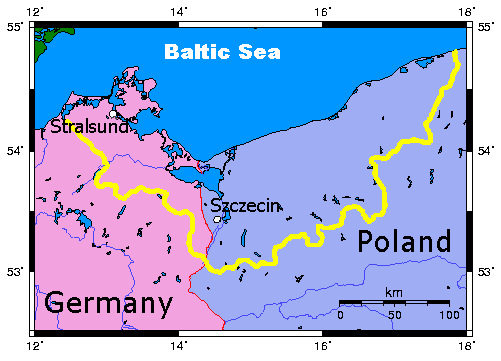
Division of Pomerania

During the war, the make-up of Mecklenburg and Vorpommern's population changed, due to wartime losses and the influx of evacuees (mainly from the Berlin and Hamburg metropolitan areas that were subject to air raids). After the war, people who fled and were expelled from the former eastern territories of Germany east of the Oder-Neisse line settled in Mecklenburg-Vorpommern (and elsewhere in Germany), increasing the population by 40%. Before the war, Mecklenburg and Western Pomerania had a population of 1,278,700, of whom many perished during the war and others moved west in the course of the Red Army's advance. In 1947, some 1,426,000 refugees from the former eastern parts of Germany were counted. Most of them settled in rural communities, but the urban population also increased, most notably in Schwerin from 65,000 (1939) to 99,518 (January 1947), in Wismar from 29,463 to 44,173, and in Greifswald from 29,488 to 43,897. Western Pomerania was additionally stripped of the area around the Pomeranian regional capital Stettin/Szczecin as well as the city itself, despite its location to the west of the river Oder.

==== German Democratic Republic ====
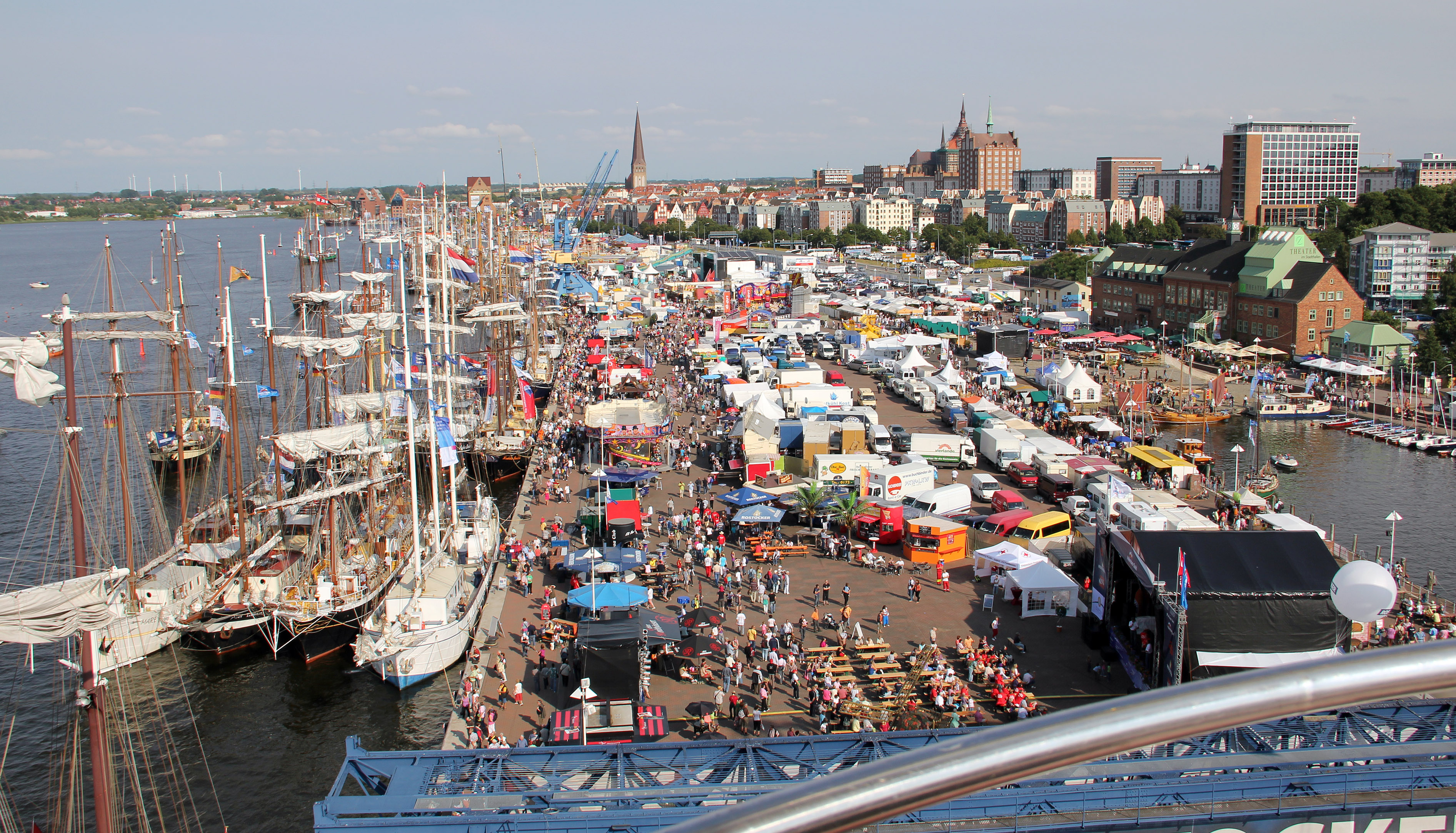
Rostock was the major overseas port of East Germany, and is one of the most important Baltic Sea ports today. Pictured is Hanse Sail, one of the world's largest maritime events.

On 5 June 1946, a law enacted by the Soviets constituted a provisional German administration (Beratende Versammlung, English: "Consulting assembly") under Soviet supervision on 29 June 1946. After elections on 20 October 1946, a Landtag replaced the Beratende Versammlung and created the constitution of 16 January 1947, for the Land Mecklenburg-Vorpommern. On 18 April 1947, the state's name was shortened to Land Mecklenburg. Mecklenburg became a constituent state ("Land") of the German Democratic Republic (GDR) upon its formation in 1949.

Among the states of the GDR, Mecklenburg absorbed by far the largest share of German expellees from Central and Eastern Europe relative to its population size. The vast majority of expellees from Pomerania who arrived in the GDR settled in Mecklenburg. In October 1949, expellees made up 43.3% of the population.

In 1952, the East German government abandoned the term Land in this context and redesignated its administrative territorial divisions as "districts" (German: Bezirke). The territory of Mecklenburg and Vorpommern was divided into three districts that covered roughly the same area: Bezirk Rostock, Bezirk Schwerin and Bezirk Neubrandenburg. These were commonly known as the Nordbezirke (northern districts) under the highly centralised GDR government. The East German government developed the shipyards in the old Hanseatic ports (the largest being in Rostock and Stralsund), and also established the Greifswald Nuclear Power Plant in Lubmin near Greifswald.

==== Reunification ====
At the time of German reunification in 1990, the eastern states were reconstituted along their postwar boundaries (with minor adjustments) as they had existed until 1952, and the historic name Mecklenburg-Vorpommern was restored. Since 1990, the state has undergone dramatic changes. What had been largely an industrial and agricultural economy is increasingly driven by the service, tourism, and high-tech sectors. The old towns, hundreds of castles and manors, resort buildings, windmills, churches, and various other cultural monuments of Mecklenburg-Vorpommern have been renovated in recent years. Since 2013, net migration into the state has been positive again.

== Geography ==
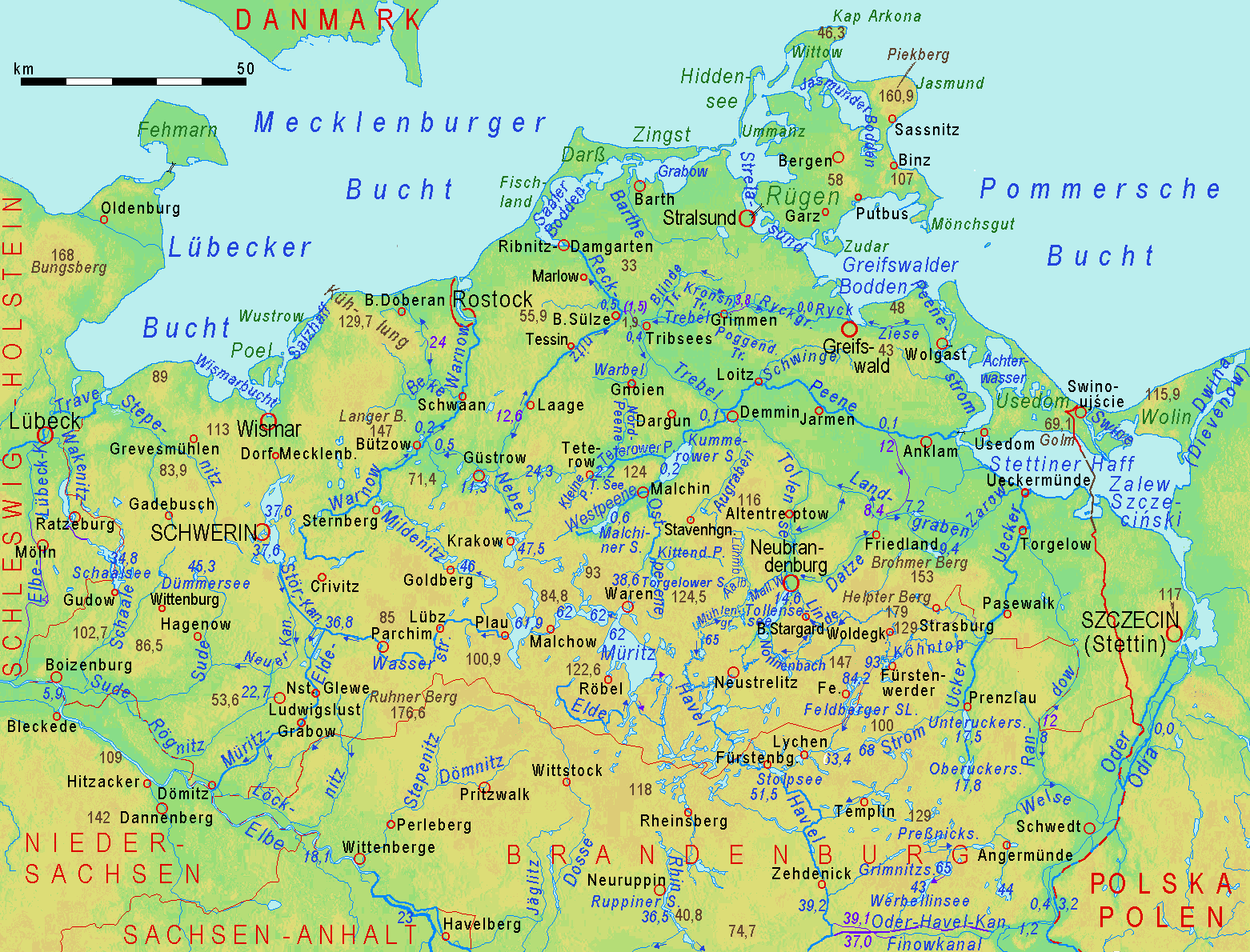
Map of Mecklenburg-Vorpommern, showing locations, heights, and waters

Constituent regions and districts of the state, including the border of the historical Mecklenburg and Western Pomerania regions

Schwerin

=== Location and urban areas ===
Sixth-largest in area and fourteenth in overall population among Germany's sixteen Bundesländer (federal states), Mecklenburg-Vorpommern is bounded to the north by the Baltic Sea, to the west by Schleswig-Holstein, to the southwest by Lower Saxony, to the south by Brandenburg, and to the east by the West Pomeranian Voivodeship in Poland.

Mecklenburg-Vorpommern's state capital is Schwerin. The largest city is Rostock with approximately 205,000 people, followed by Schwerin. Other major cities include Neubrandenburg, Stralsund, Greifswald, Wismar and Güstrow.

=== Landscape ===
The state's Baltic Sea coast is about 2,000 km (1,200 mi) long and features several islands, most notably Germany's two biggest islands Rügen and Usedom, but also a number of smaller islands such as Hiddensee and Poel. Mecklenburg-Vorpommern's varied coastline also has many peninsulas such as Fischland-Darß-Zingst and various lagoons (also known as Bodden or Haff).

A total of 283 nature reserves, 110 landscape reserves and three of Germany's fourteen national parks are scattered all over the state.

==== Lakes ====
The southern part of the state is characterized by a multitude of lakes within the Mecklenburg Lakeland, the largest of which is Lake Müritz (also the largest German lake), followed by Lake Schwerin, Plauer See and Lake Kummerow. The "land of a thousand lakes" (German: Land der tausend Seen) is hallmarked by its unspoilt nature. Due to its clean air and idyllic setting, medical tourism has become a notable tourism sector in the region.

==== National parks ====
Name	Established	Size (km^{2})	Map	Illustration
Jasmund National Park	1990	30	Mecklenburg-Vorpommern is located in Mecklenburg-Vorpommern	
Müritz National Park	1990	318	Mecklenburg-Vorpommern is located in Mecklenburg-Vorpommern	
Western Pomeranian Lagoons National Park	1990	805	Mecklenburg-Vorpommern is located in Mecklenburg-Vorpommern	

== Culture ==
Over the centuries, Mecklenburg and Vorpommern have developed and maintained strong regional cultures. It can generally be described as North German and has similar linguistic and historic characteristics to other north German states, such as Schleswig-Holstein. People in Vorpommern, as a result of that territory being a former province of Prussia, tend to look slightly more towards Berlin and Brandenburg than people in Mecklenburg would.

=== Architecture ===
The cities are characterised by a certain "Hanseatic" style also found in other parts of northern Germany (e.g. Lübeck) as well as in countries bordering the Baltic Sea like Estonia (e.g. Tallinn) or Latvia (e.g. Riga). A common feature of many towns in Mecklenburg and Vorpommern are red Brick Gothic churches and houses dating back to the Middle Ages. Also stepped and tailed gables are a typical feature of the Hanseatic old towns, such as Stralsund, Wismar and Greifswald.

The old towns are usually built around one or several market places with a church or the town hall. Often towns were founded at the Baltic Sea, one of the many lakes or a river for logistical and trade motives.

Rural areas of Mecklenburg-Vorpommern are often characterized by Brick Gothic village churches and agricultural heritage, like brick homesteads, thatched roof houses, windmills, manor houses and castles.

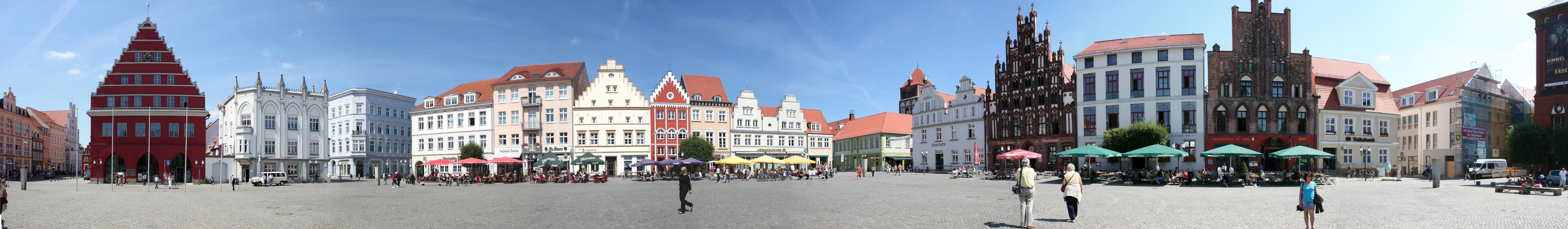
The central market square of Greifswald (Marktplatz), showing typical architecture of Mecklenburg-Vorpommern

=== Museums, art and theatres ===
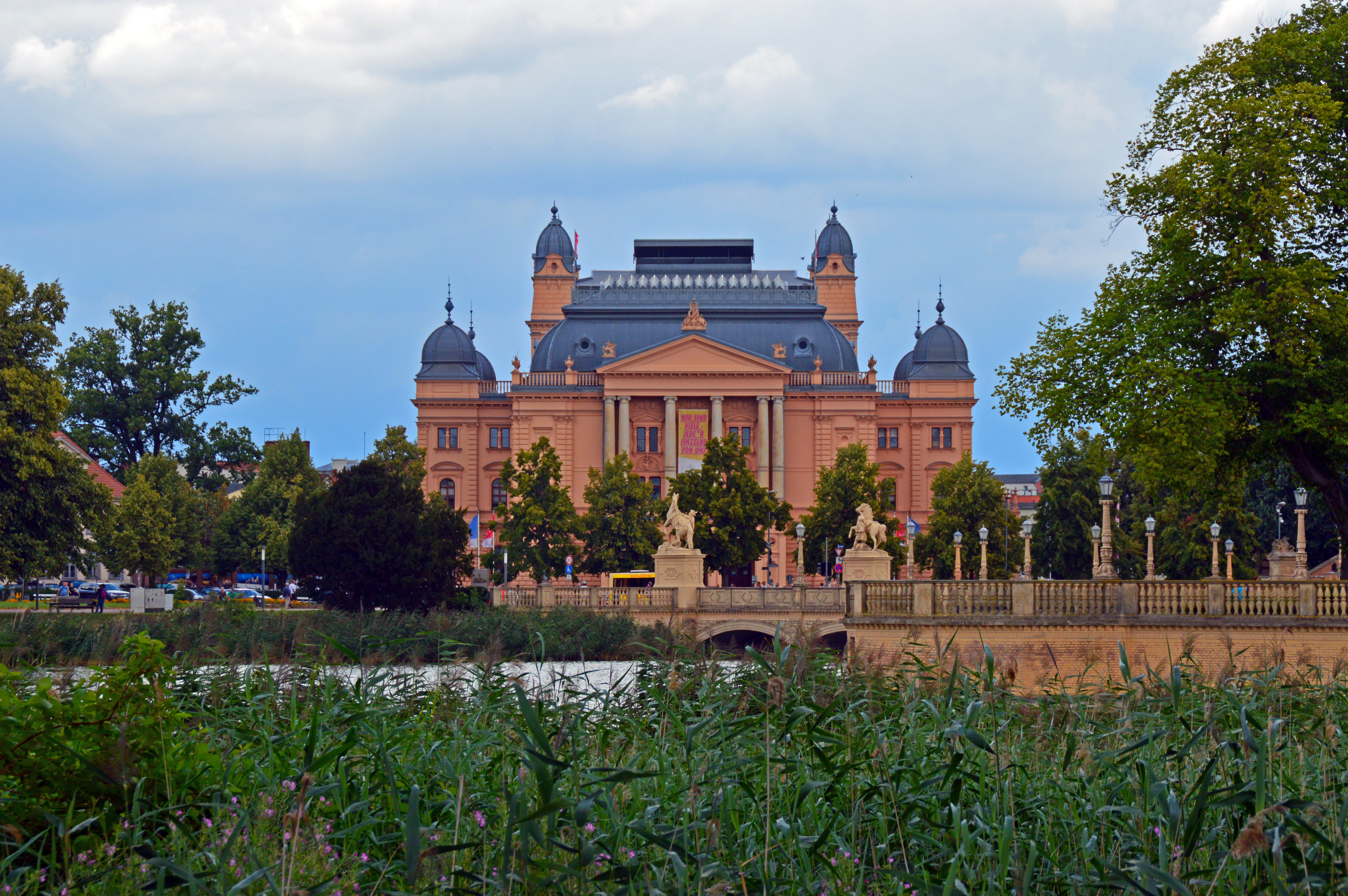
The Mecklenburg State Theatre in Schwerin

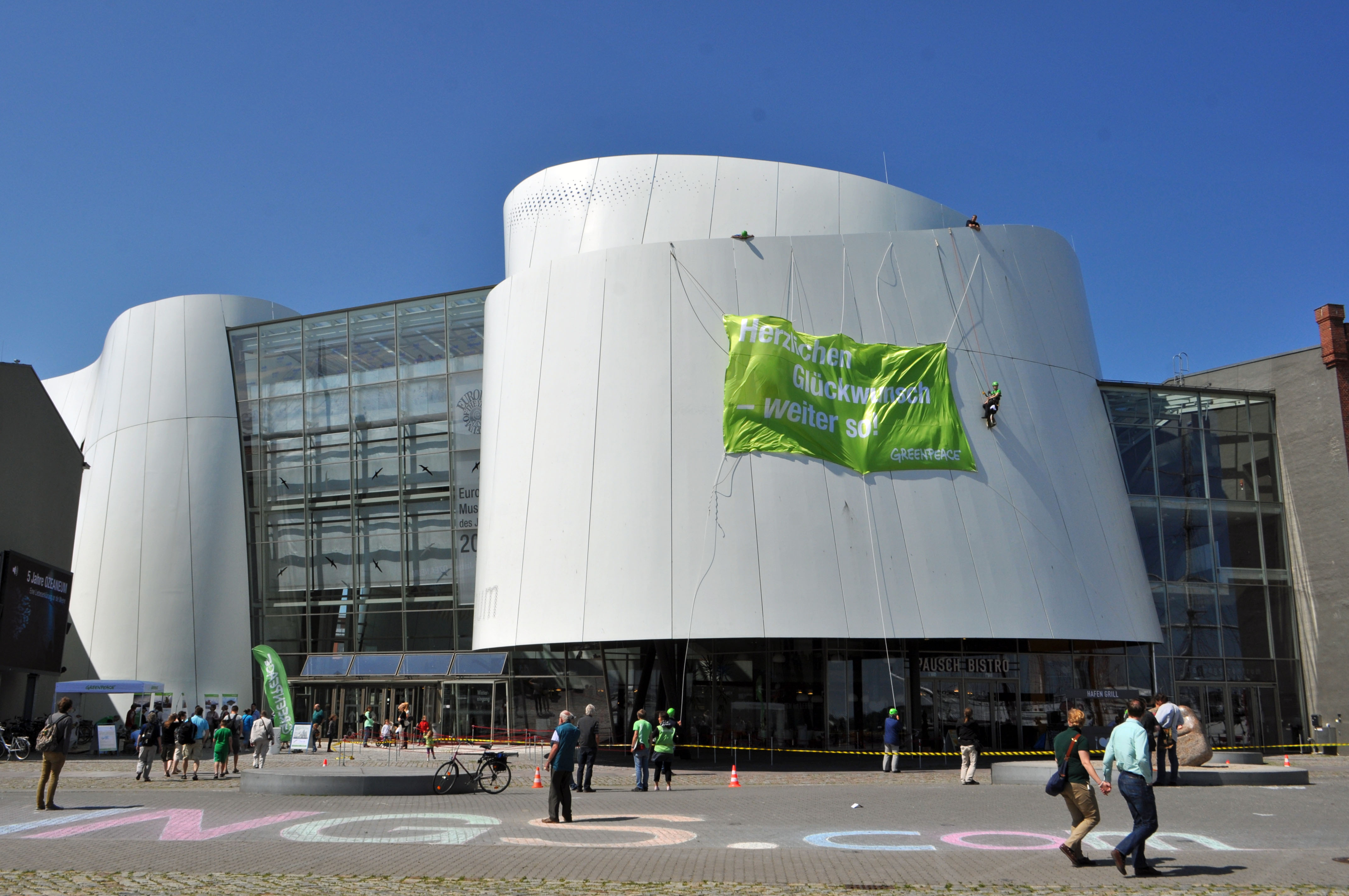
The Ozeaneum in Stralsund, Europe's museum of the year 2010 and Northern Germany's most popular museum (as part of the German Oceanographic Museum)

The largest publicly funded theatres in the state are the Mecklenburg State Theatre, the Rostock People's Theatre, the Theatre of West Pomerania, with venues in Stralsund, Putbus and Greifswald, and the Mecklenburg State Theatre of Neustrelitz with venues in Neubrandenburg and Neustrelitz. All four theatres offer both drama and musical theatre as well as orchestral music. Other important theatres are the Ernst Barlach Theatre of Güstrow, the Theatre of Parchim, the Anklam Theatre and the Wismar Theatre. There are also many small theatres on the Baltic coast and in individual artist's villages and resorts (e.g. the popular concert pavilions at the Baltic Sea). Since its growing importance for summer tourism, open-air theatres and festivals become more common again as well, such as the Störtebeker Festival on the island of Rügen, and the Vineta Festival on Usedom.

Theatre	Visitors 2007/2008
Mecklenburg State Theatre, Schwerin	170,681
West Pomeranian Theatre and Symphony Orchestra, Greifswald/Stralsund	140,902
Neustrelitz/Neubrandenburg Theatre and Orchestre	120,042
Rostock People's Theatre	119,758
West Pomeranian State Theatre, Anklam	71,825
Mecklenburg State Theatre, Parchim	14,773

Since 1993, the Störtebeker Festival has taken place in Ralswiek on the island of Rügen. It is Germany's most successful open-air theatre.

Notable museums include, for example, the Schwerin State Museum and the Pomeranian State Museum at Greifswald. The German Oceanographic Museum with its Ozeaneum in Stralsund is the most popular museum in northern Germany. Furthermore, the German Amber Museum in Ribnitz-Damgarten, Rostock's Abbey of the Holy Cross and Rostock Art Gallery are of national importance. The oldest museum in Mecklenburg-Western Pomerania is Stralsund's Cultural History Museum, the smallest is the Professor Wandschneider Sculpture Museum in Plau am See.

Mecklenburg-Vorpommern is home to many cultural events throughout the year. During summer, many open-air concerts and operas are open to visitors. The Mecklenburg-Vorpommern Festival (Festspiele Mecklenburg-Vorpommern) attracts a sizeable audience by performing classical concerts in parks, churches and castles.

Caspar David Friedrich, a famous romanticist painter born in Greifswald, immortalised parts of the state in several of his paintings.

=== Language ===
Low German dialects

Today the vast majority of people speak Standard German; a few centuries ago, most people spoke Low German (German: Plattdeutsch or Niederdeutsch), a language that is still kept alive within various communities and cultural events.

=== Food and drinks ===
Like most German regions, Mecklenburg and Vorpommern have their own traditional dishes, often including fish, beef and pork. Rostock has its own type of bratwurst called Rostocker Bratwurst. A famous dish from Western Pomerania is Bismarck Herring. Rote Grütze is a popular dessert. The largest beer breweries are Mecklenburgische Brauerei Lübz (Lübzer Pils), Hanseatische Brauerei Rostock, Darguner Brauerei and Störtebeker Braumanufaktur (Stralsund, multiple winner of the World Beer Cup). Besides, there are many smaller breweries and craft beer variations, such as the Mellenthin Castle Beer from Usedom Island.

=== Religion ===
Religion in Mecklenburg-Vorpommern − 2025
Religion	Percent
None or other	84.7%
EKD Protestants	12.2%
Roman Catholics	3.1%

As of 2025, the majority (84.7%) of the citizens of Mecklenburg-Western Pomerania are not religious or adhere to other religions. 12.2% are members of the Protestant Church in Germany and 3.1% of the Catholic Church.

Following the Reformation, led in Germany by Martin Luther, as well as a period of Swedish rule, the traditional faith in Mecklenburg-Vorpommern is Protestantism, specifically Lutheranism. There are also a number of Catholics and people of other faiths.

In May 2012 the Evangelical Lutheran Church of Mecklenburg merged with North Elbian Evangelical Lutheran Church and Pomeranian Evangelical Church into the new Evangelical Lutheran Church in Northern Germany. Some parishes of the state belong to Evangelical Church of Berlin and Brandenburg.

There are also Jewish communities, in the state capital of Schwerin (including Wismar) and in the city of Rostock. Historically, there were also synagogues in smaller towns, of which some are still preserved (like Röbel, Krakow am See and Boizenburg). The state's Jewish organisation is part of the Central Council of Jews in Germany.

=== Immigration ===
As of 2024, roughly 10.7% of the state's population has a migration background, of whom 124,620 people or 7.92%, do not possess German citizenship. The largest group of non-German residents in the state by citizenship are Ukrainians, followed by Poles, and Syrians.

Nationality	31 December 2024				31 December 2023				31 December 2022	
Nationality	Population		%		Population		%		Population	%
Nationality	Nr.	+/-	pp.	+/-	Nr.	+/-	pp.	+/-	Population	%
Ukraine	29,360	▲1,240	1.87	▲0.07	28,120	▲2,210	1.80	▲0.07	25,910	1.73
Poland	16,975	▼450	1.08	▲0.04	17,425	▲925	1.04	▼0.03	16,500	1.07
Syria	13,685	▲95	0.87	▲0.03	13,590	▲960	0.84	▲0.01	12,630	0.83
Afghanistan	6,395	▲525	0.41	▲0.02	5,870	▲840	0.39	▲0.03	5,030	0.36
Romania	5,365	▼410	0.34	▲0.01	5,775	▲205	0.33	▼0.02	5,570	0.35
Russia	4,365	▼120	0.28	▲0.01	4,485	▲290	0.27	▼0.01	4,195	0.28
Turkey	3,655	▲220	0.23	▲0.01	3,435	▲1,055	0.22	▲0.01	2,380	0.21
Vietnam	2,860	▲130	0.18	0.00	2,730	▲145	0.18	▲0.01	2,585	0.17
Bulgaria	2,500	▼245	0.16	▲0.01	2,745	▲60	0.15	▼0.02	2,685	0.17
India	1,910	▲265	0.12	0.00	1,645	▲55	0.12	▲0.02	1,590	0.10
Iran	1,875	▲125	0.12	0.00	1,750	▲70	0.12	▲0.01	1,680	0.11
Iraq	1,570	▼50	0.10	0.00	1,620	▼145	0.10	0.00	1,765	0.10
Italy	1,555	▼120	0.10	0.00	1,675	▲70	0.10	0.00	1,605	0.10
Hungary	1,375	▼60	0.09	▲0.01	1,435	▲45	0.08	▼0.01	1,390	0.09
Lithuania	1,365	▼190	0.09	▲0.01	1,555	▼50	0.08	▼0.02	1,605	0.10
Armenia	1,340	▼15	0.09	▲0.01	1,355	▲40	0.08	0.00	1,315	0.08
Greece	1,100	▼70	0.07	0.00	1,170	▼15	0.07	0.00	1,185	0.07
Eritrea	900	▼25	0.06	0.00	925	▲5	0.06	0.00	920	0.06
Spain	880	▼30	0.06	▲0.01	910	▲30	0.05	▼0.01	880	0.06
Somalia	875	▲285	0.06	▲0.01	590	▲55	0.05	▲0.01	535	0.04
Netherlands	825	▼35	0.05	0.00	860	▲10	0.05	0.00	850	0.05
Georgia	735	▼190	0.05	0.00	925	▼15	0.05	▼0.01	940	0.06
Austria	725	▼35	0.05	▲0.01	760	▲35	0.04	▼0.01	725	0.05
China	710	▲20	0.05	▲0.01	690	▼10	0.04	0.00	700	0.04
Croatia	700	▼65	0.04	0.00	765	▼25	0.04	▼0.01	790	0.05
Serbia	700	▼55	0.04	0.00	755	▲30	0.04	▼0.01	725	0.05
Others	20,320	▲25	1.29	▲0.04	20,295	▲1,115	1.25	▲0.07	19,180	1.18
Total	124,620	▲765	7.92	▲0.27	123,855	▲7,990	7.65	▲0.09	115,865	7.56

=== Vital statistics ===
- Births from January to September 2016 = ▲10,224
- Births from January to September 2017 = ▼9,836
- Deaths from January to September 2016 = ▼15,251
- Deaths from January to September 2017 = ▲15,532
- Natural growth from January to September 2016 = ▲ -5,027
- Natural growth from January to September 2017 = ▼ -5,696

== Education ==
=== Universities and colleges ===
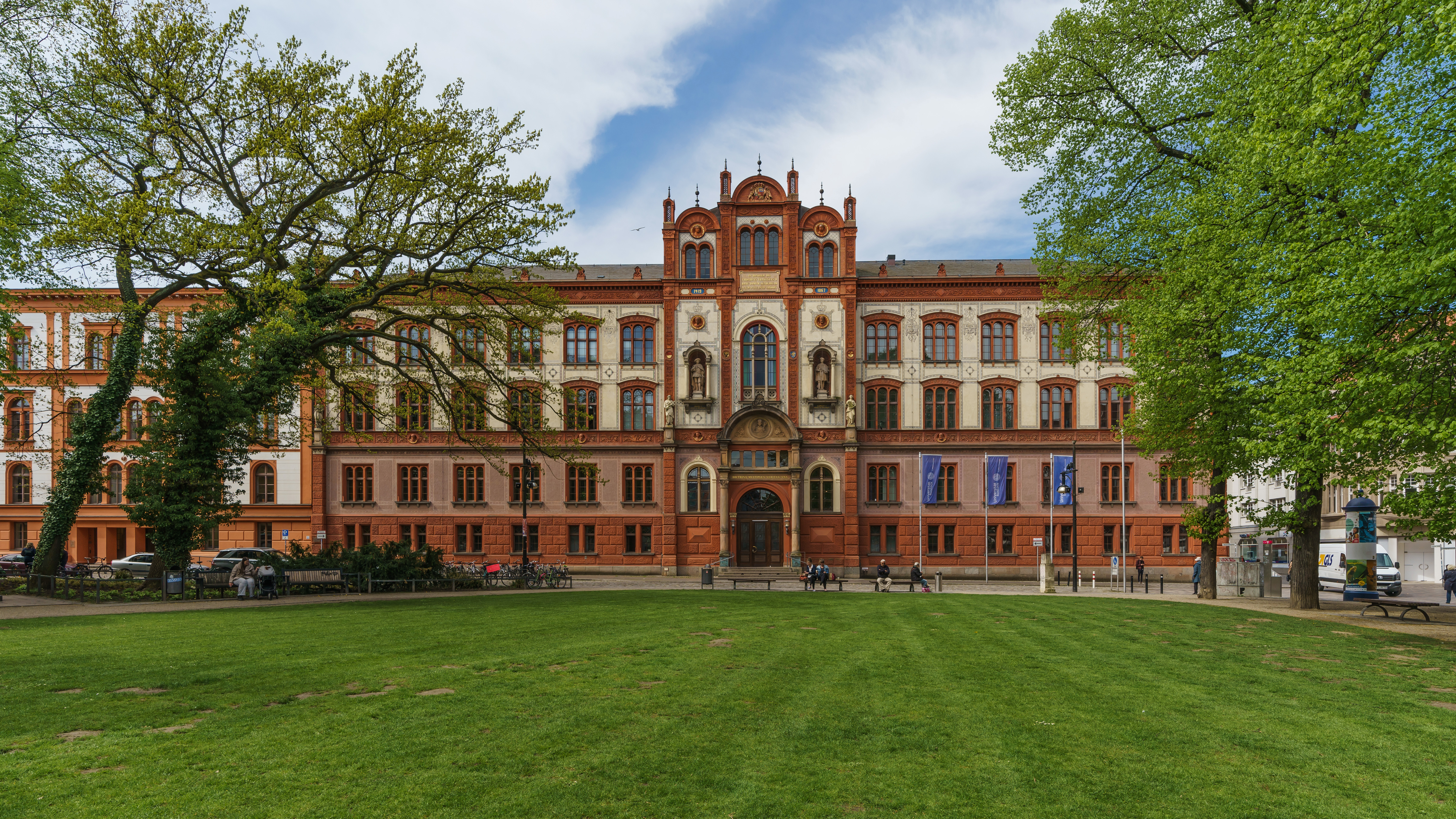
The University of Rostock

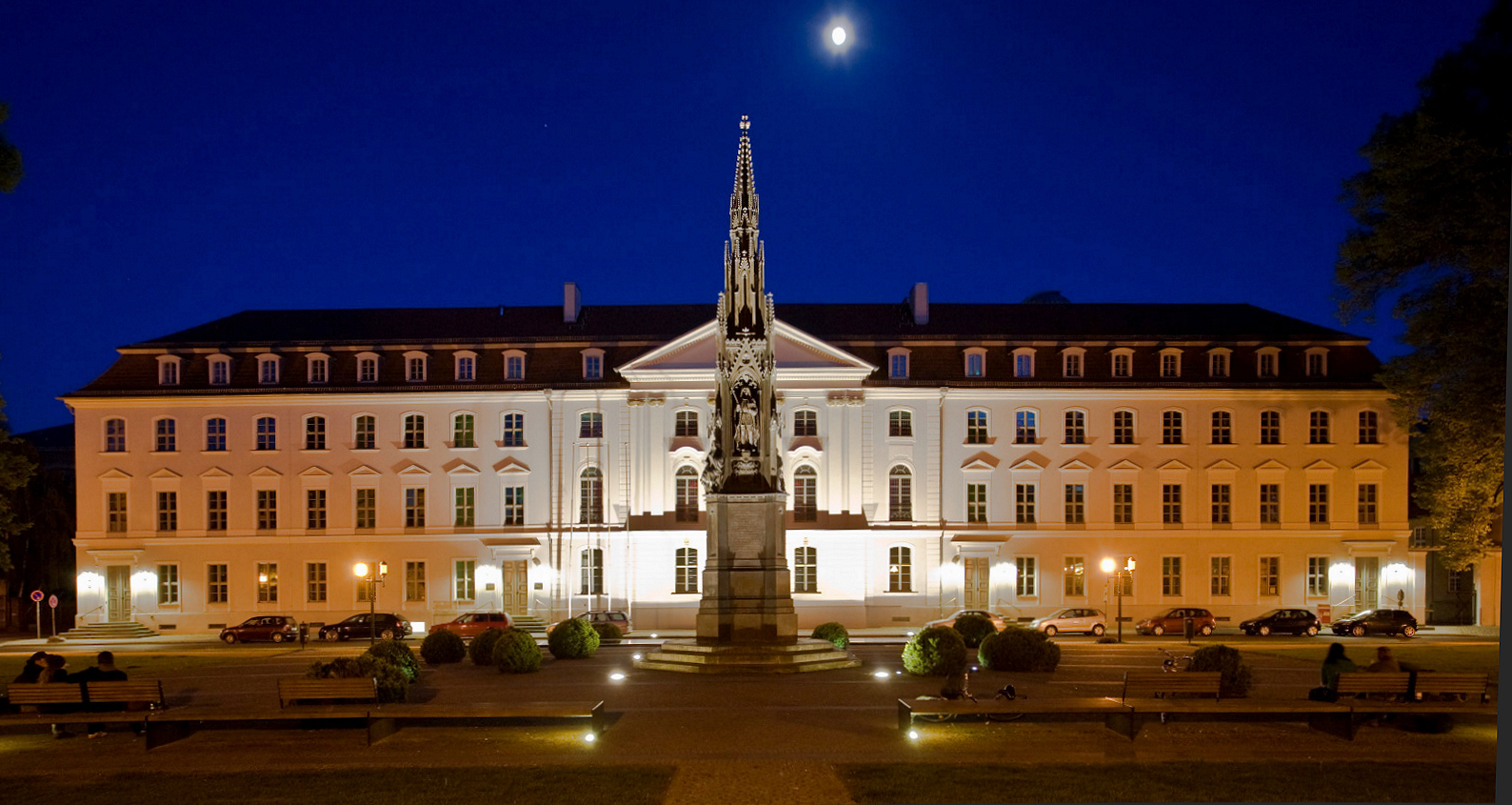
The University of Greifswald

Mecklenburg-Vorpommern has the two oldest universities of the Baltic Sea region, also among the oldest of Germany and all of Europe:

- University of Greifswald (established 1456)
- University of Rostock (established 1419)

Also, there are further colleges / technological universities:

- Fachhochschule des Mittelstands (FHM) in Rostock and Schwerin (private)
- Rostock University of Music and Theatre
- Hochschule Wismar (University of Applied Sciences: Technology, Business and Design)
- Hochschule Stralsund (University of Applied Sciences)
- Hochschule Neubrandenburg (University of Applied Sciences)
- Fachhochschule für öffentliche Verwaltung, Rechtspflege und Polizei Güstrow (University of Administration, Judicature and Police in Güstrow)
- Hochschule der Bundesagentur für Arbeit with its Schwerin campus
- DesignSchule Schwerin with options to study design (private; game/fashion/media/web design)

=== Schools ===
The state's school system is centralised. There are two main types of schools, Regionalschule (for the majority of pupils) and Gymnasium (for the top 30% of each year's students, leading to the university entrance qualification "Abitur"). Besides, there are also independent schools, comprehensive schools and trade schools.

== Politics ==
Article 20 of the State Constitution states that the Landtag is the "site of political decision-making". The Mecklenburg-Vorpommern Landtag is elected democratically by the citizens of the state and sits for a 5-year legislative period. The seat of the Landtag is located at Schwerin Palace in Schwerin. The essential functions of the Landtag are to elect the Minister-President of the state; to discuss and decide on laws which have been proposed by the government, by any four members of the Landtag, or a people's initiative or petition for a referendum initiated directly by the people; and to control the state government.

=== Minister-President ===
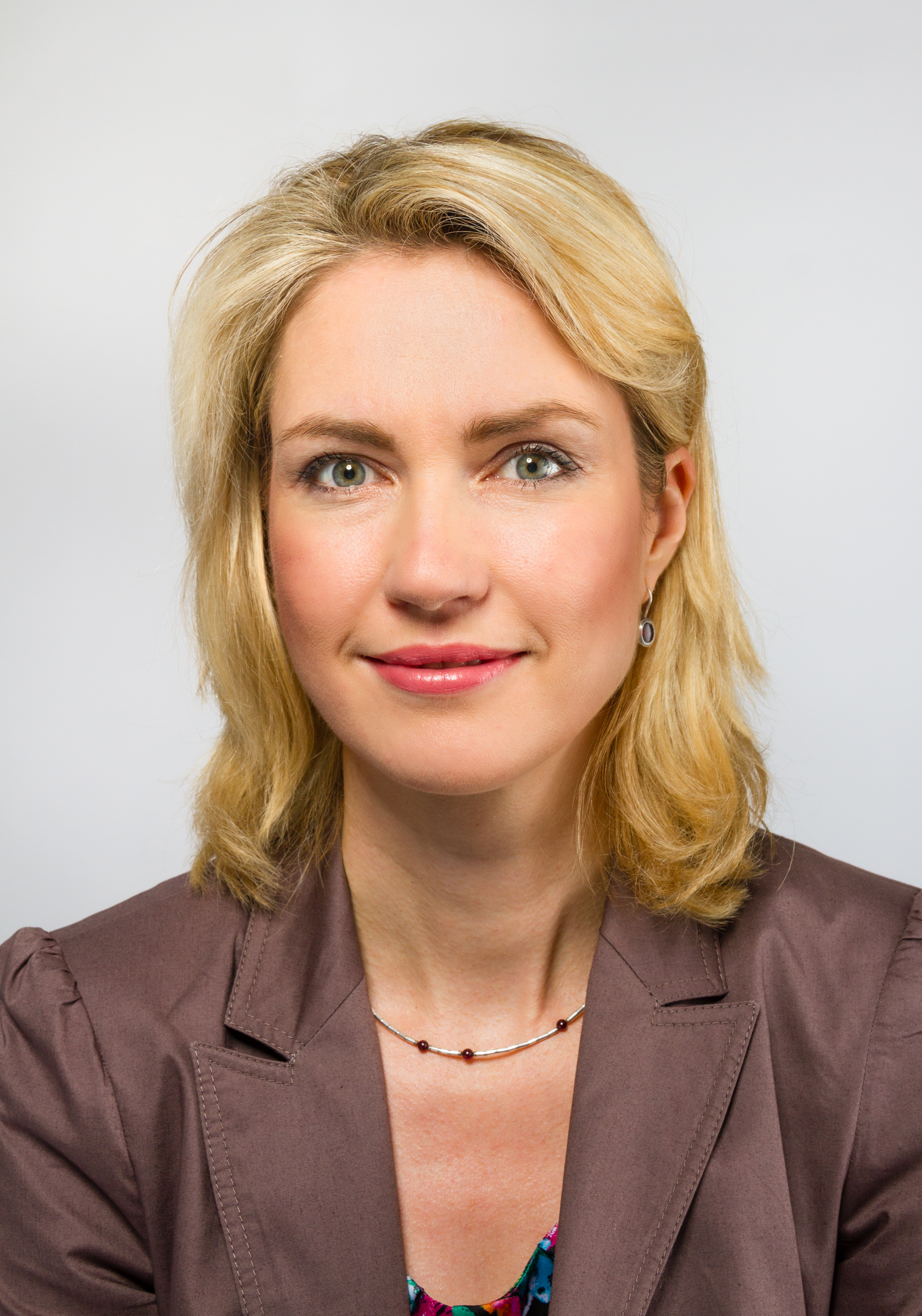
Manuela Schwesig, Minister-President since 2017

The executive is led by a cabinet, in turn led by a Minister-President, who is the official head of state and government. The election to determine the Minister-President is held no later than four weeks after the newly elected Landtag is convened.

=== Landtag ===
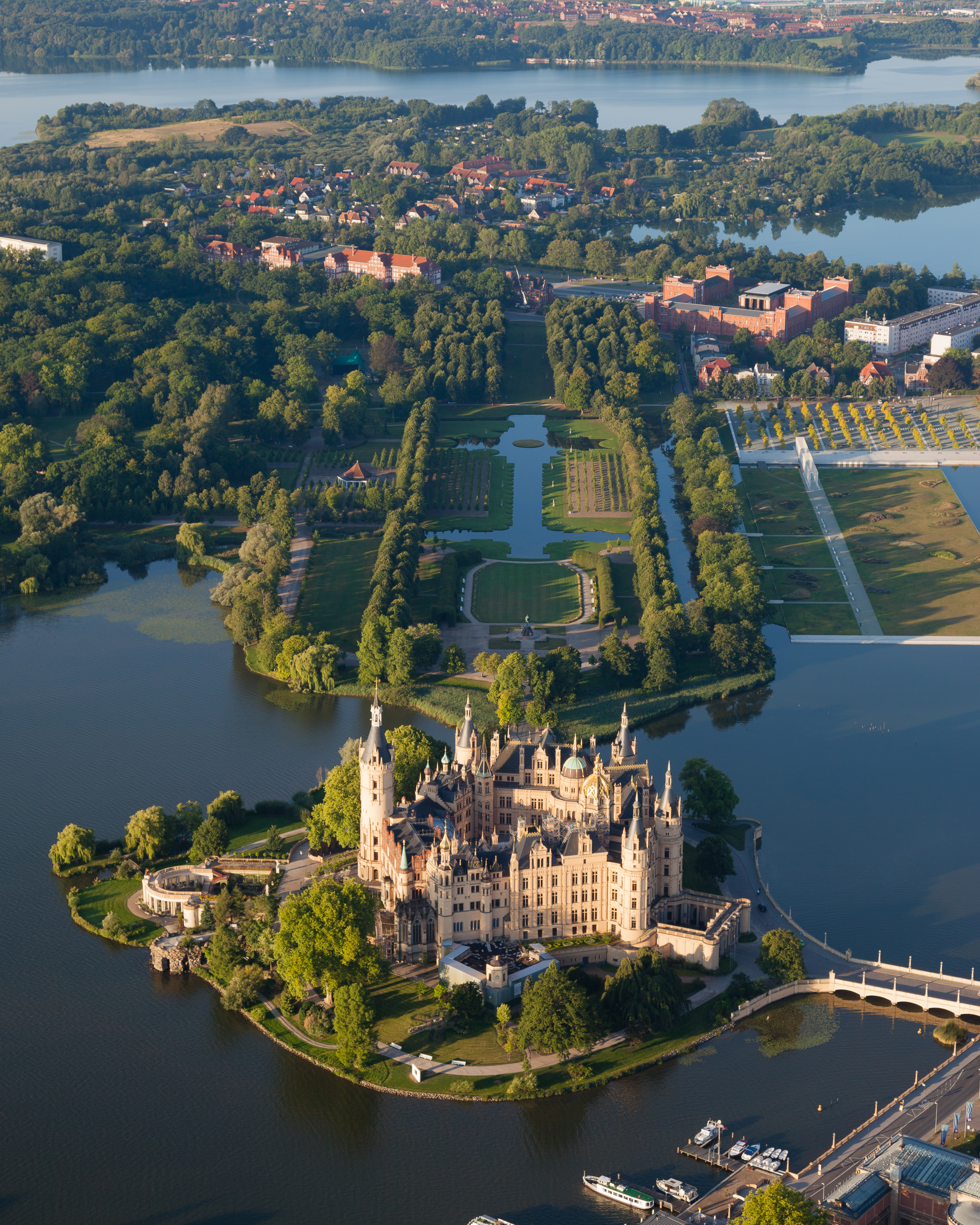
The Schwerin Palace, seat of the Landtag of Mecklenburg-Vorpommern, is one of more than 2,000 palaces and castles in the state.

The last election of the Landtag of Mecklenburg-Vorpommern took place on 21 September 2026. The Alternative for Germany (AfD) more than doubled its vote share to 38%, though is not expected to form a government due to the firewall against the far-right policy. The governing SPD suffered only minor losses, dropping to 35% and second place. All of the other four represented parties dropped close to or under the 5% threshold for representation, with the co-governing The Left and the Greens winning 5 seats each and likely joining a red–red–green coalition.

While the FDP was expected to lose representation also in this state, the Christian Democratic Union of Germany (CDU) unexpectedly was reported close to 5% in exit pools. Soon, federal CDU leader and chancellor Friedrich Merz called it a disaster and vowed to stay on. A few hours later, CDU was confirmed at 4.9% and failed for the first time ever to win seats in a German state election, adding to the 2026 Merz government crisis. The Sahra Wagenknecht Alliance (BSW) also remained below 5%, as it did in Berlin.

The Landtag has been led by Minister President Manuela Schwesig since 2017.

Party	Constituency			Party list			Total seats	+/–
Party	Votes	%	Seats	Votes	%	Seats	Total seats	+/–
Alternative for Germany (AfD)	400,086	39.51	22	388,026	38.22	10	32	+18
Social Democratic Party (SPD)	378,532	37.38	14	360,393	35.50	15	29	–5
The Left (DIE LINKE)	78,886	7.79	0	66,388	6.54	5	5	–4
Alliance 90/The Greens (GRÜNE)	28,427	2.81	0	57,587	5.67	5	5	0
Christian Democratic Union (CDU)	63,212	6.24	0	49,629	4.89	0	0	–12
Sahra Wagenknecht Alliance (BSW)	40,497	4.00	0	49,036	4.83	0	0	New
Human Environment Animal Protection Party (Tierschutzpartei)				11,131	1.10	0	0	0
Free Democratic Party (FDP)	15,441	1.52	0	10,415	1.03	0	0	–5
Tradesman's Party of Germany				4,798	0.47	0	0	New
Free Voters (FW)	2,199	0.22	0	3,823	0.38	0	0	0
Die PARTEI	446	0.04	0	2,760	0.27	0	0	0
Team Freedom (TF)	653	0.06	0	2,545	0.25	0	0	New
Pirate Party Germany (PIRATEN)				2,003	0.20	0	0	0
Volt Germany (Volt)	715	0.07	0	1,909	0.19	0	0	New
WE LIVE DEMOCRACY (WLD)	591	0.06	0	1,249	0.12	0	0	New
Ecological Democratic Party (ÖDP)				981	0.10	0	0	0
Party of Progress (PdF)				940	0.09	0	0	New
Alliance C – Christians for Germany (Bündnis C)				892	0.09	0	0	0
Communist Party of Germany (KPD)				818	0.08	0	0	0
Lobbyists for Children (LfK)	99	0.01	0				0	New
Independents	2,880	0.28	0				0	0
Total	1,012,664	100.00	36	1,015,323	100.00	35	71	▼8
Valid votes	1,012,664	100.00		1,015,323	100.00			
Invalid/blank votes	0	0.00		0	0.00			
Total votes	1,012,664	100.00		1,015,323	100.00			
Registered voters/turnout	1,012,664	100.00		1,015,323	100.00			
Source: State Returning Officer

Popular vote
SPD	39.59%
AfD	16.72%
CDU	13.30%
LINKE	9.94%
GRÜNE	6.30%
FDP	5.80%
Other	8.35%

Landtag seats
SPD	43.04%
AfD	17.72%
CDU	15.19%
LINKE	11.39%
GRÜNE	6.33%
FDP	6.33%

=== Districts ===
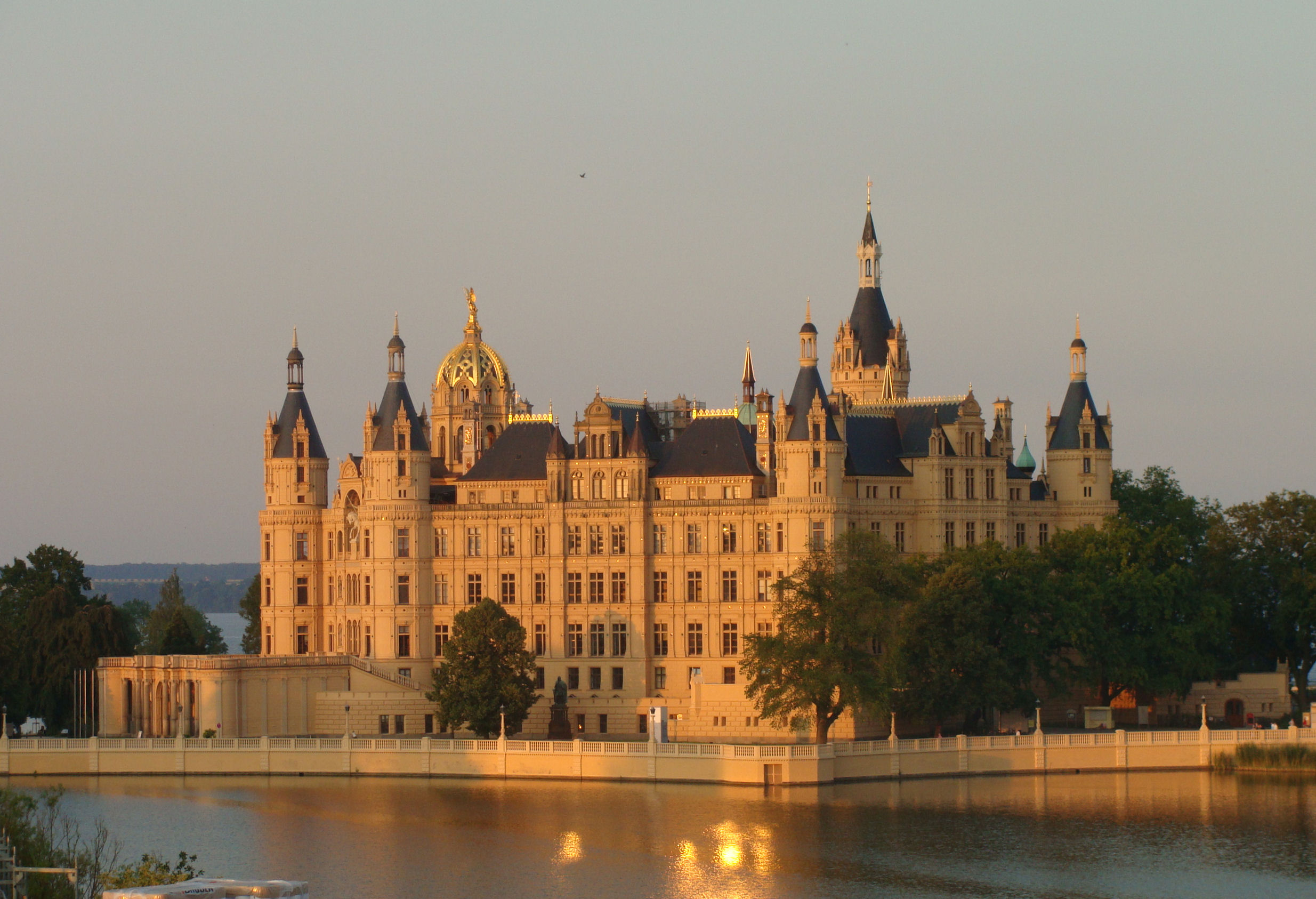
Schwerin, the state capital of Mecklenburg-Vorpommern

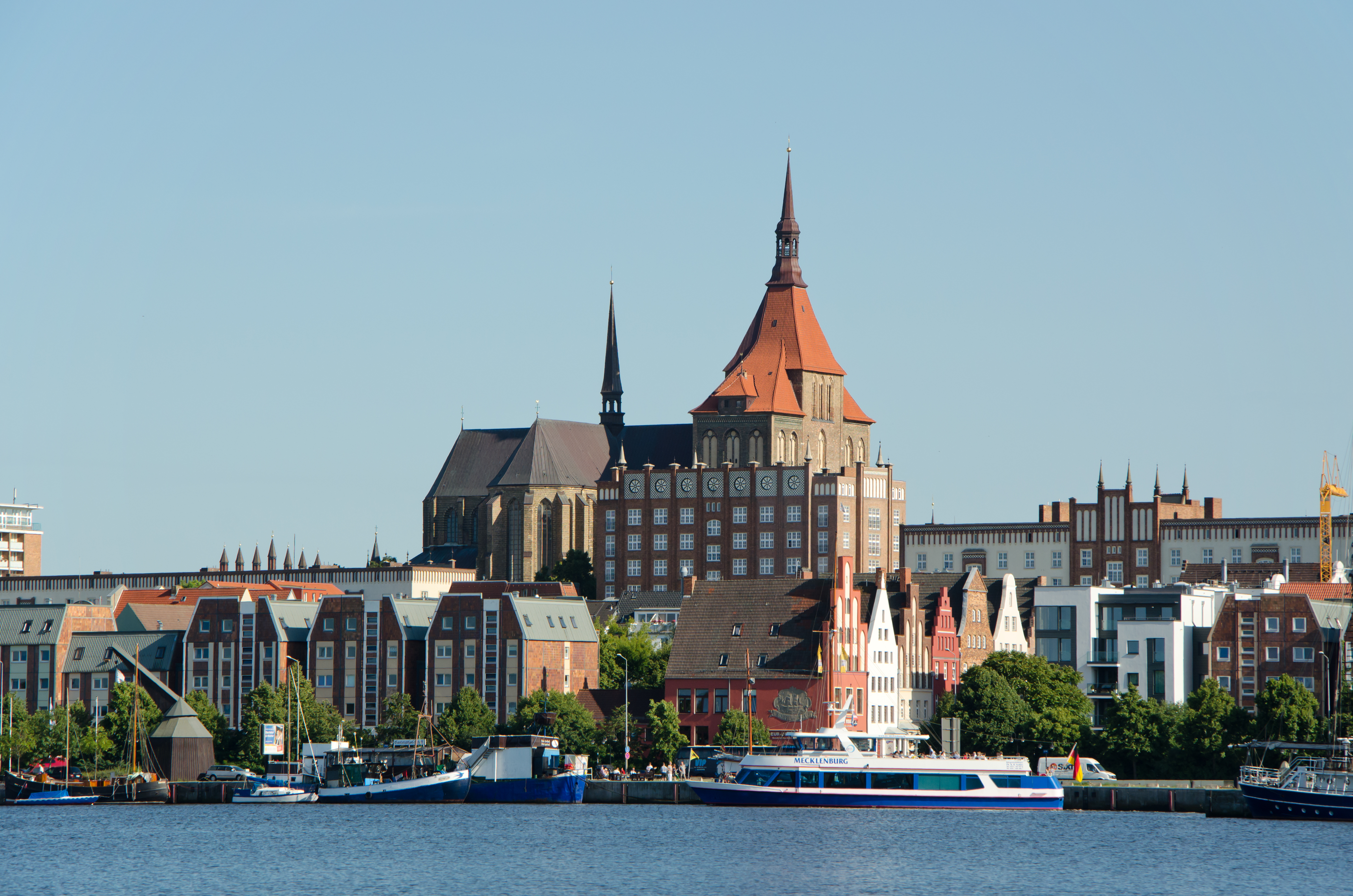
Rostock, the largest city in Mecklenburg-Vorpommern

Since 4 September 2011, Mecklenburg-Vorpommern is divided into six Kreis (districts):

1. Landkreis Rostock
2. Ludwigslust-Parchim
3. Mecklenburgische Seenplatte
4. Nordwestmecklenburg
5. Vorpommern-Greifswald
6. Vorpommern-Rügen

Also counting two independent urban districts:

1. Rostock (HRO)
2. Schwerin (SN)

== Economy ==
The gross domestic product (GDP) of the state was 44.5 billion euros in 2018, accounting for 1.3% of German economic output. GDP per capita adjusted for purchasing power was 25,400 euros or 84% of the EU27 average in the same year. The GDP per employee was 83% of the EU average. The GDP per capita was the lowest of all German states.

=== Labour market ===
Mecklenburg-Vorpommern is the least densely populated and least industrial German state, being the sixth largest in area, but only the 14th in population. Formerly, unemployment has been negatively affected by the breakdown of non-competitive former GDR industries after the German reunification in the 1990s. As of 2018 unemployment is the lowest in more than 15 years while the economy is growing and the number of jobs is increasing continually. Growing sectors are biotechnology, information technology, life sciences, maritime industry and tourist services.

In Mecklenburg-Vorpommern, approximately 732,200 people were gainfully employed in 2008 with 657,100 of them were white and blue collar workers. About 4,200 new jobs were created in 2007. Employees worked an average of 1,455 hours a year. The number of self-employed did not change in 2008. Three out of every four of all workers are employed in the service sector. In October 2018 the unemployment rate stood at 7.1% and was the third highest rate in Germany.

Year	2000	2001	2002	2003	2004	2005	2006	2007	2008	2009	2010	2011	2012	2013	2014	2015	2016	2017	2018
Unemployment rate in %	17.8	18.3	18.6	20.1	20.4	20.3	19.0	16.5	14.1	13.5	12.7	12.5	12.0	11.7	11.2	10.4	9.7	8.6	7.9

=== Tourism ===
Mecklenburg-Vorpommern is the top destination for intra-German tourism and is gaining importance for international tourism. The main tourist regions are:

- Islands: Rugia and Usedom (Germany's two largest islands), Poel and Hiddensee;
- Peninsula: Fischland-Darß-Zingst (with Ahrenshoop and Zingst);
- Seaside resorts: Binz, Boltenhagen, Graal-Müritz, Heringsdorf (including Bansin and Ahlbeck), Heiligendamm, Kühlungsborn, Warnemünde and Zinnowitz;
- Stettin Lagoon: Ueckermünde;
- Hinterland: particularly the Mecklenburg Lakeland;
- Cities: Stralsund and Wismar (both listed as UNESCO World Heritage Sites), Schwerin, Güstrow, Rostock and Greifswald, which have a diverse cultural heritage.
- Night sky: Mecklenburg-Vorpommern is home to some of the most pristine night skies in Germany, especially in the area near Nationalpark Müritz. It is a potential site for a Dark Sky Park.

As a reminder of its rich history, nearly 2,000 castles, palaces and manor houses exist in Mecklenburg-Vorpommern, many of which are used as venues for public events like concerts and festivals, such as Festspiele MV (a classical music festival).

Medical tourism based on the clean air and idyllic settings by the Baltic Sea has a growing importance to the regional tourism industry.

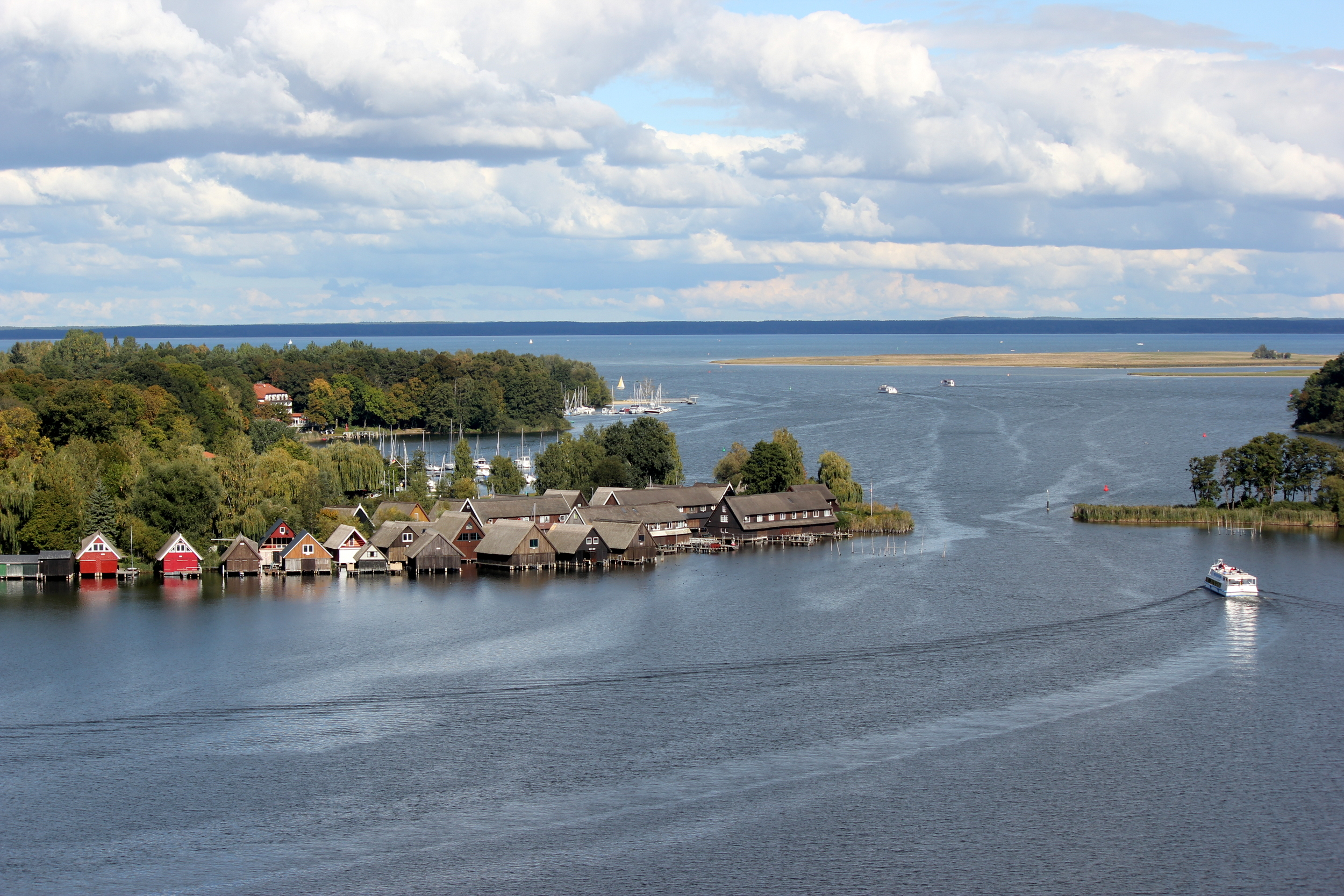
Mecklenburg Lakeland, Röbel

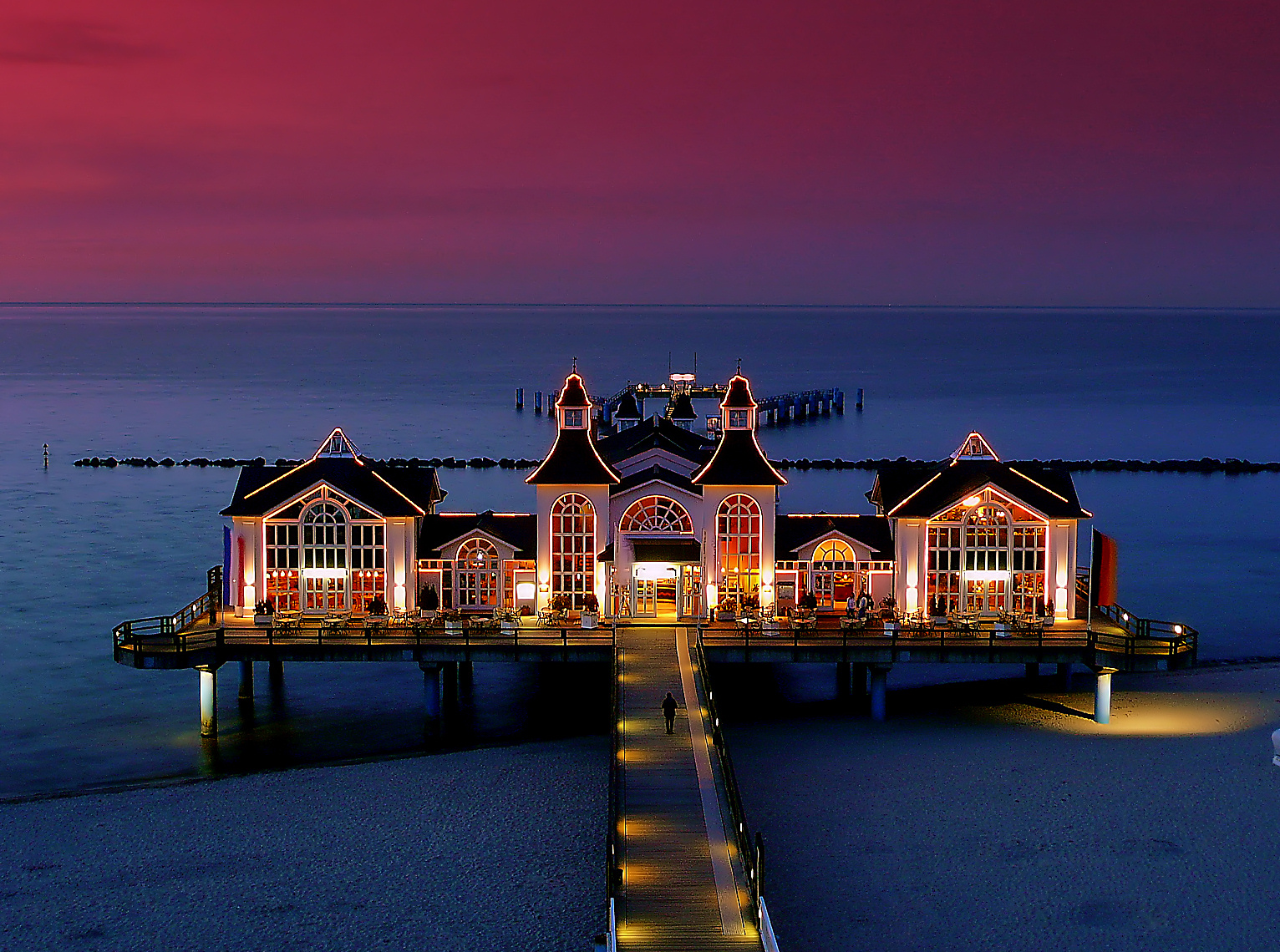
Sellin on the island of Rügen

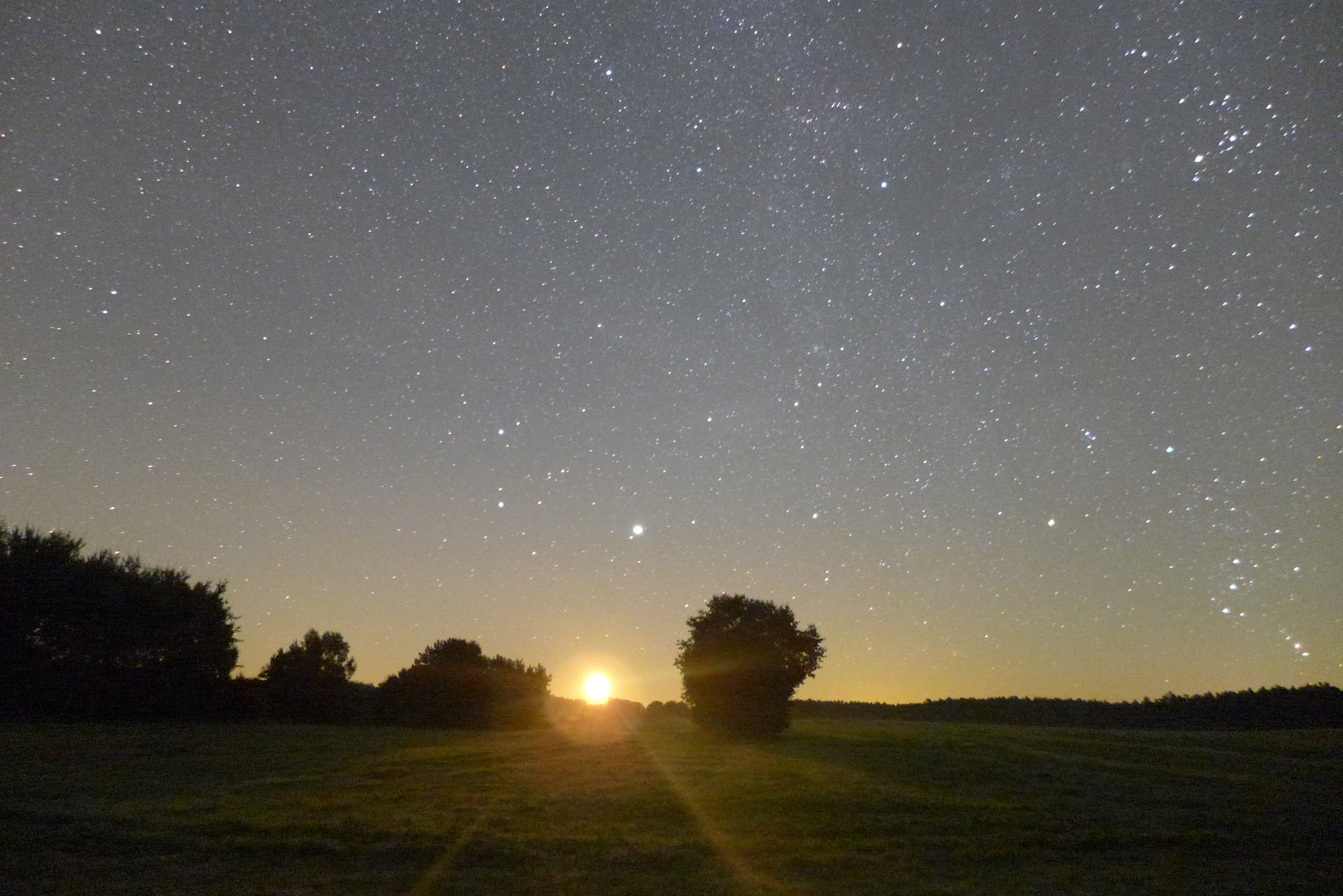
Moonrise over Nationalpark Müritz

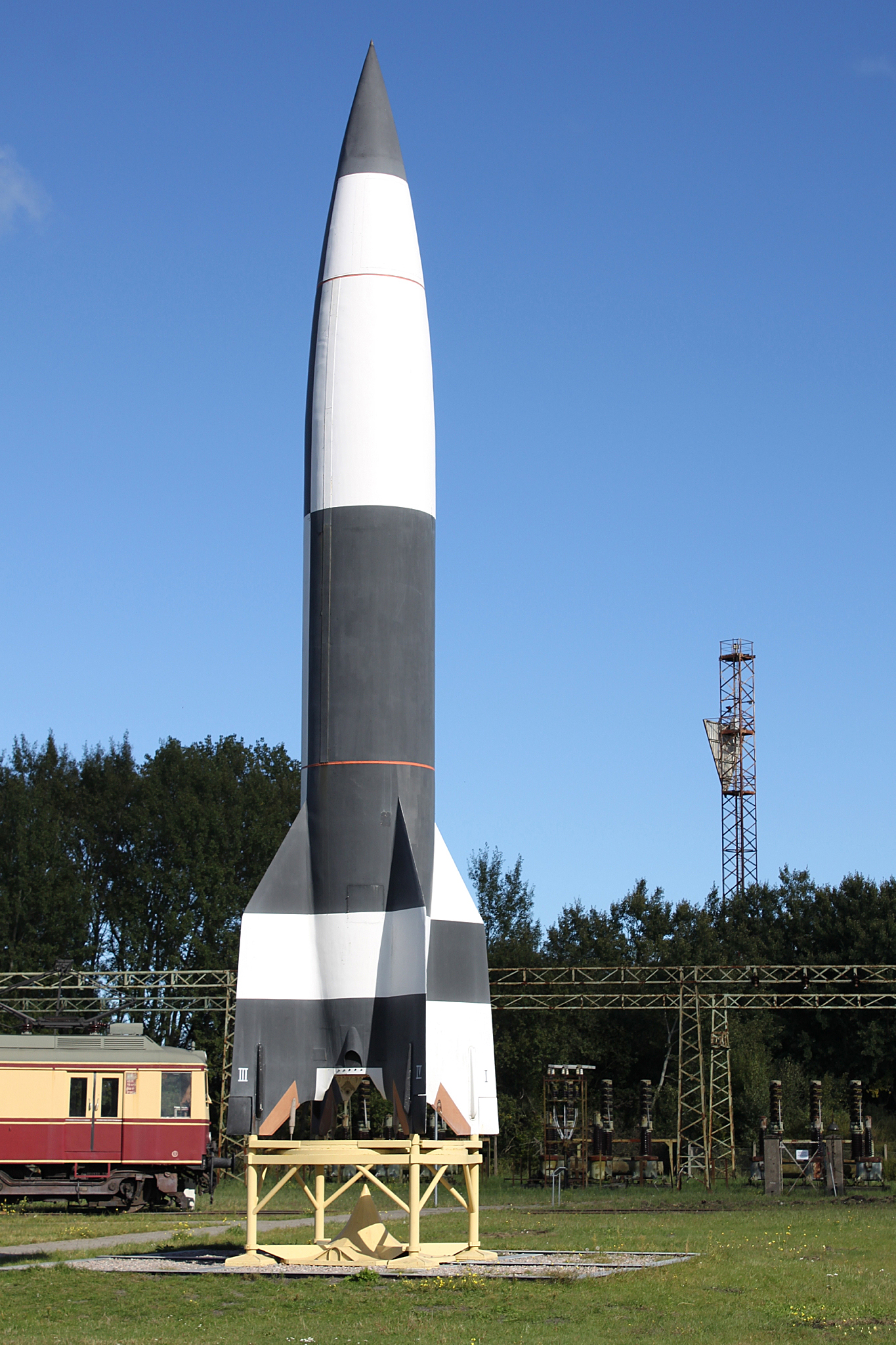
V2 rocket replica in Peenemünde. These rockets were the first man-made objects to reach space.

== Transport ==
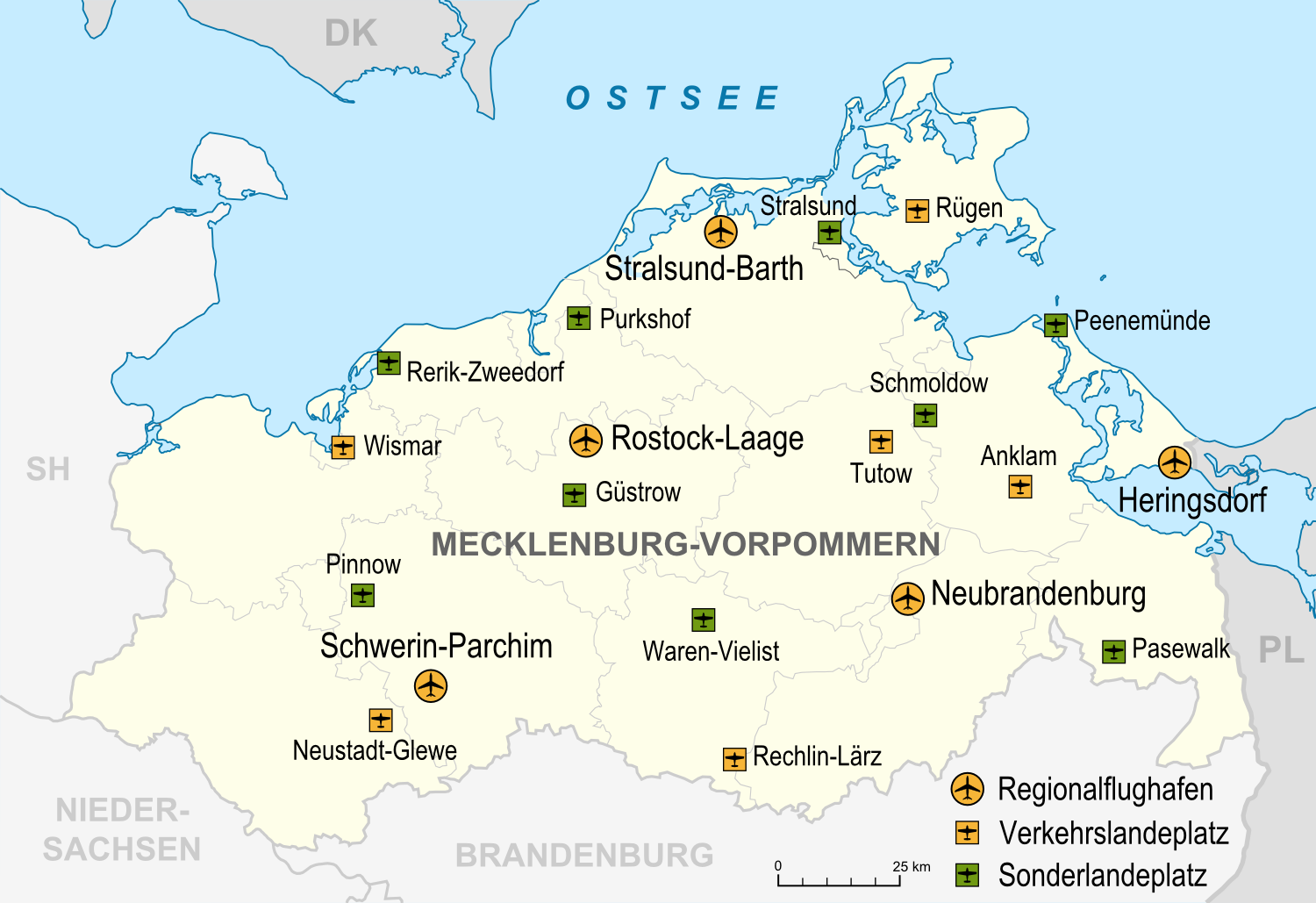
Airports in Mecklenburg-Western Pomerania

There are two airports that are currently operating in Mecklenburg-Vorpommern which are Rostock–Laage Airport and Heringsdorf Airport. However, residents of the state also use Berlin Brandenburg Airport and Hamburg Airport, which both can be easily reached by train and car.

== Sport ==
Main sporting attractions include the German football league games of F.C. Hansa Rostock and the international sailing event Hanse Sail. If the bid for the 2012 summer Olympics in Leipzig had been successful, the sailing competitions would have taken place off the coast of Rostock.

== Notable people ==
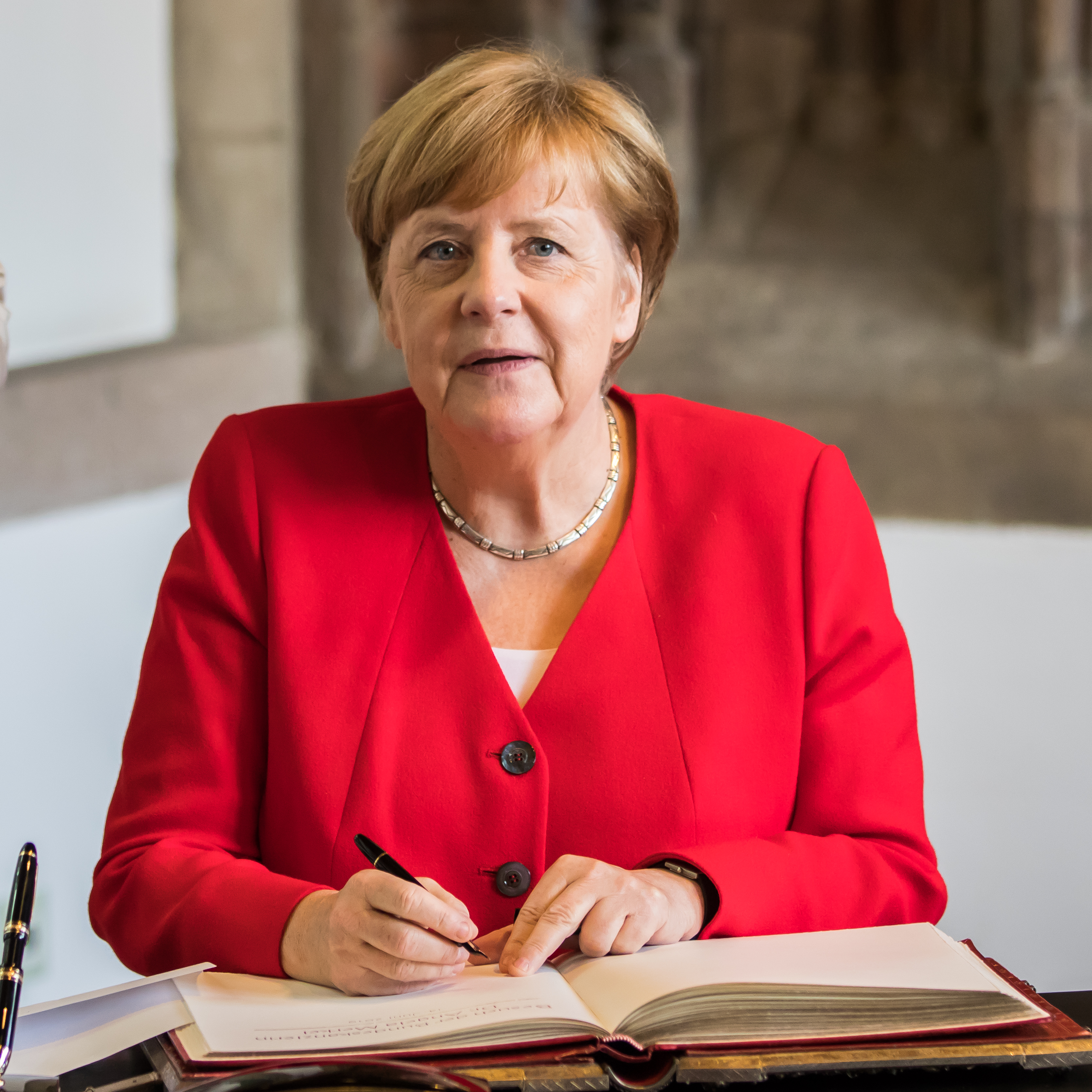
Angela Merkel's constituency was in Western Pomerania during her chancellorship.

Notable from Mecklenburg-Vorpommern include:

- Arts: Ernst Barlach, Friedrich von Flotow, Caspar David Friedrich, Marianne Hoppe, Till Lindemann, Philipp Otto Runge
- Business: Ernst Heinkel, Carl Heinrich von Siemens, Leonhard Tietz, Georg Wertheim
- Literature: Ernst Moritz Arndt, John Brinckman, Hans Fallada, Walter Kempowski, Fritz Reuter, Rudolf Tarnow, Ehm Welk
- Politics: Ernst Moritz Arndt, Dietmar Bartsch, Joachim Gauck, Egon Krenz, Gebhard Leberecht von Blücher, Angela Merkel, Helmuth von Moltke the Elder, Harald Ringstorff
- Science: Theodor Billroth, Friedrich Chrysander, Walther Flemming, Gottlob Frege, Otto Lilienthal, Gustav Mie, Ferdinand von Mueller, Paul Pogge, Carl Wilhelm Scheele, Heinrich Schliemann, Johannes Stark
- Sports: Tim Borowski, Andreas Dittmer, Thomas Doll, Carsten Jancker, Marita Koch, Toni Kroos, Sebastian Sylvester, Jan Ullrich, Jens Voigt

== Miscellaneous ==
- Mecklenburg-Vorpommern is Germany's number-one tourist location, the main destinations being the Baltic Sea coastline with islands such as Rügen or Usedom, spa towns like Heiligendamm, Kühlungsborn, Boltenhagen or Warnemünde and the Mecklenburg Lake District. It also offers important historical cities, such as Stralsund, Wismar, Greifswald and Rostock as former Hanseatic cities − or Schwerin, Güstrow, Ludwigslust and Neustrelitz as former residences.
- The first V2 Rocket which was the first explosive missile was launched in 1944 during World War II in Peenemünde on the present-day territory of Mecklenburg-Vorpommern.
- During the chancellorship of Angela Merkel, Mecklenburg-Vorpommern hosted the first official public meeting with President George W. Bush in 2006 and the 33rd G8 summit in 2007. Both political events were financed by state and federal budgets.
- Mecklenburg-Vorpommern is one of four first-level administrative divisions containing the name of region of Pomerania, the other being the Kuyavian-Pomeranian Voivodeship, Pomeranian Voivodeship and West Pomeranian Voivodeship in Poland.

== Gallery ==
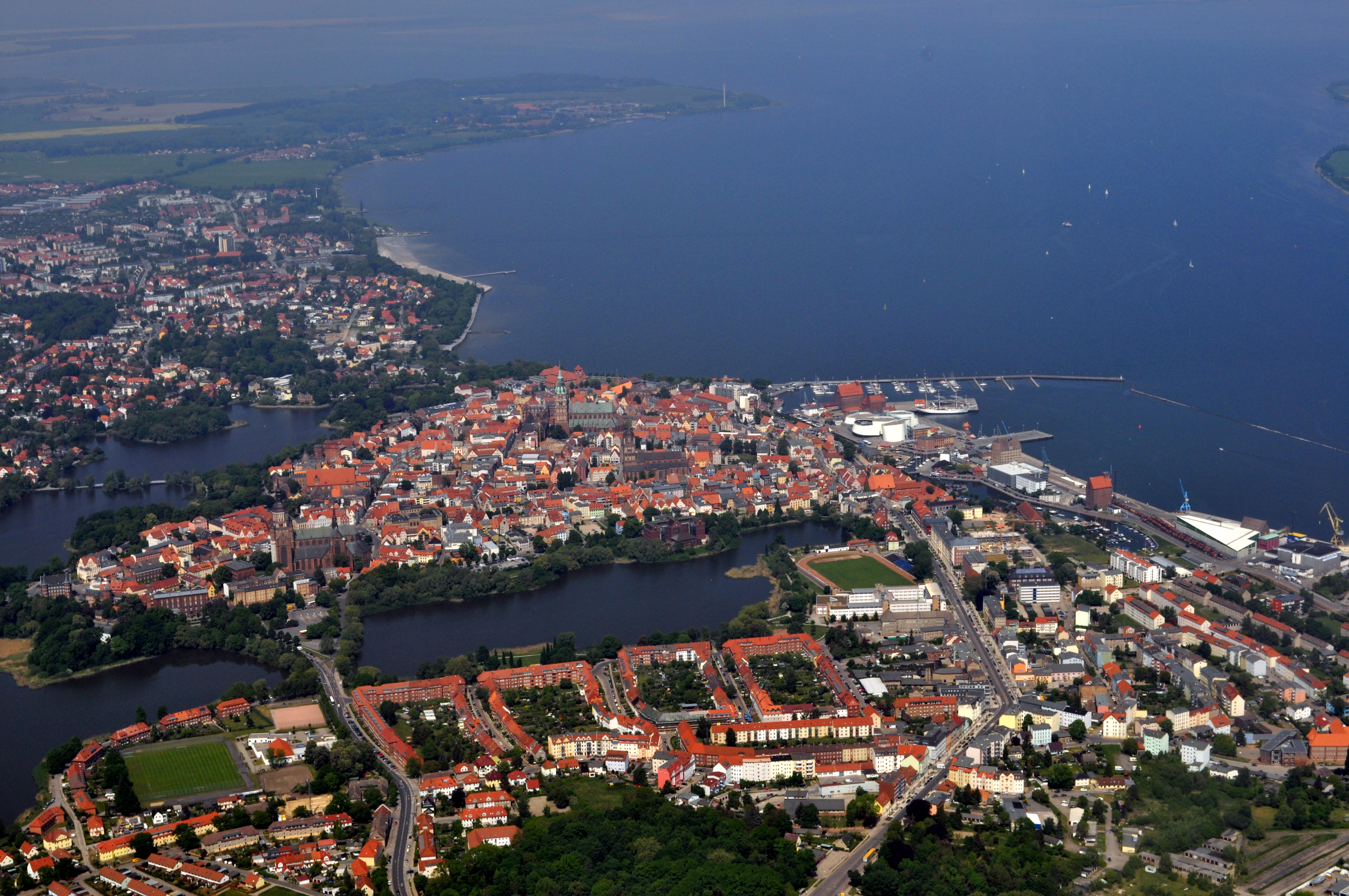
Stralsund − aerial view of an old town, protected by UNESCO

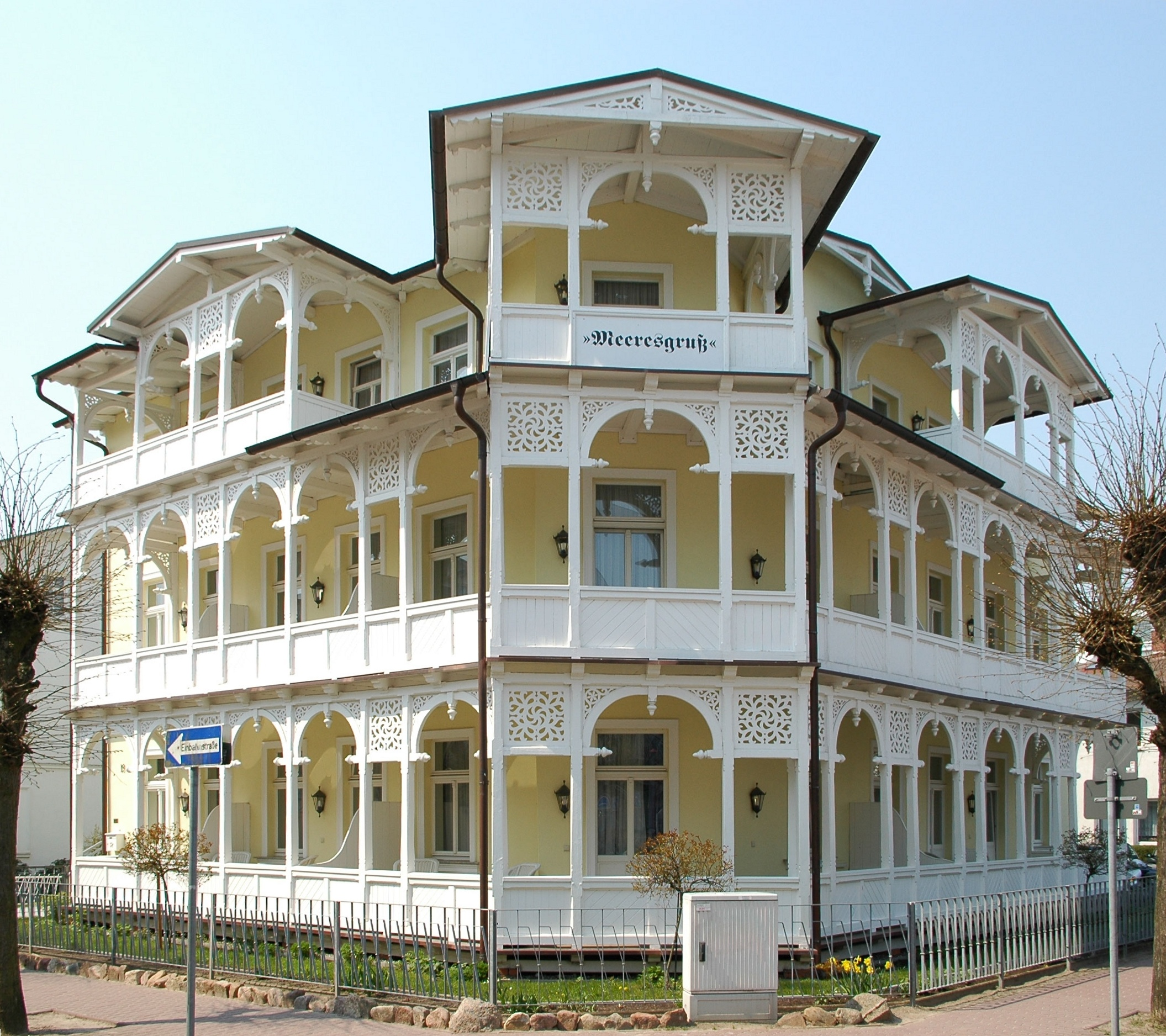
Binz − typical German resort architecture (Bäderarchitektur) at the Baltic Sea

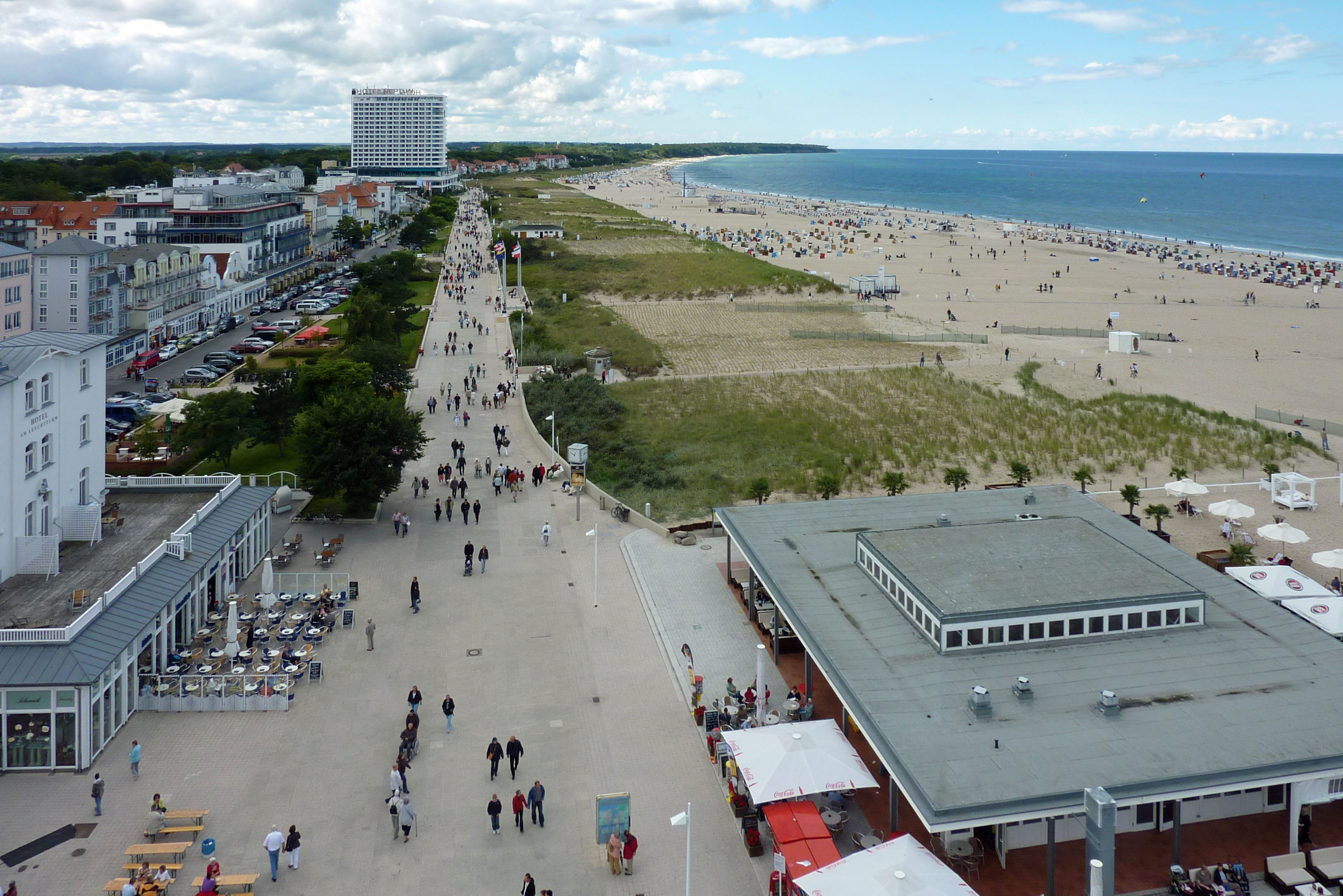
Beach Promenade of Warnemünde, part of Rostock

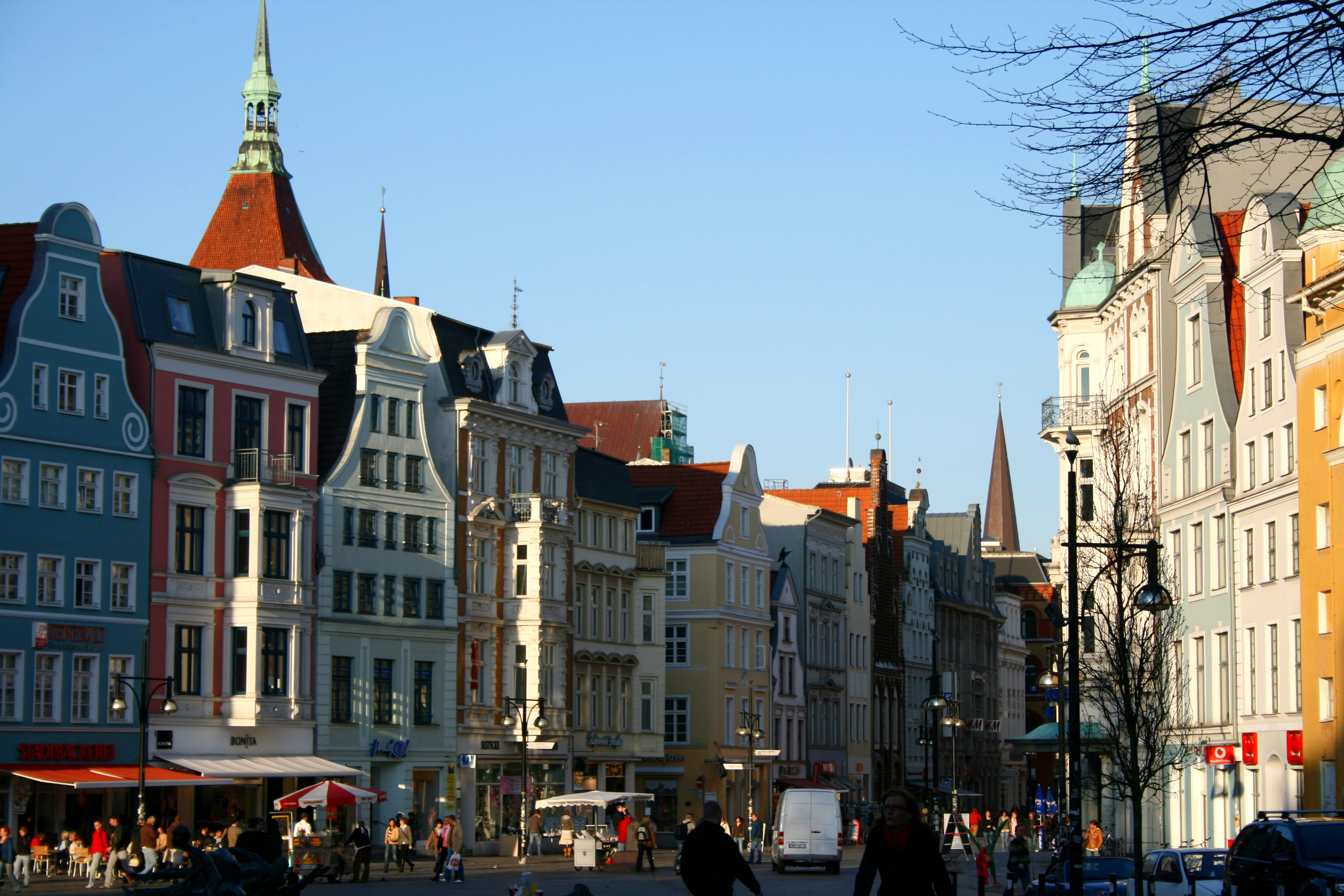
Rostock − Shopping street

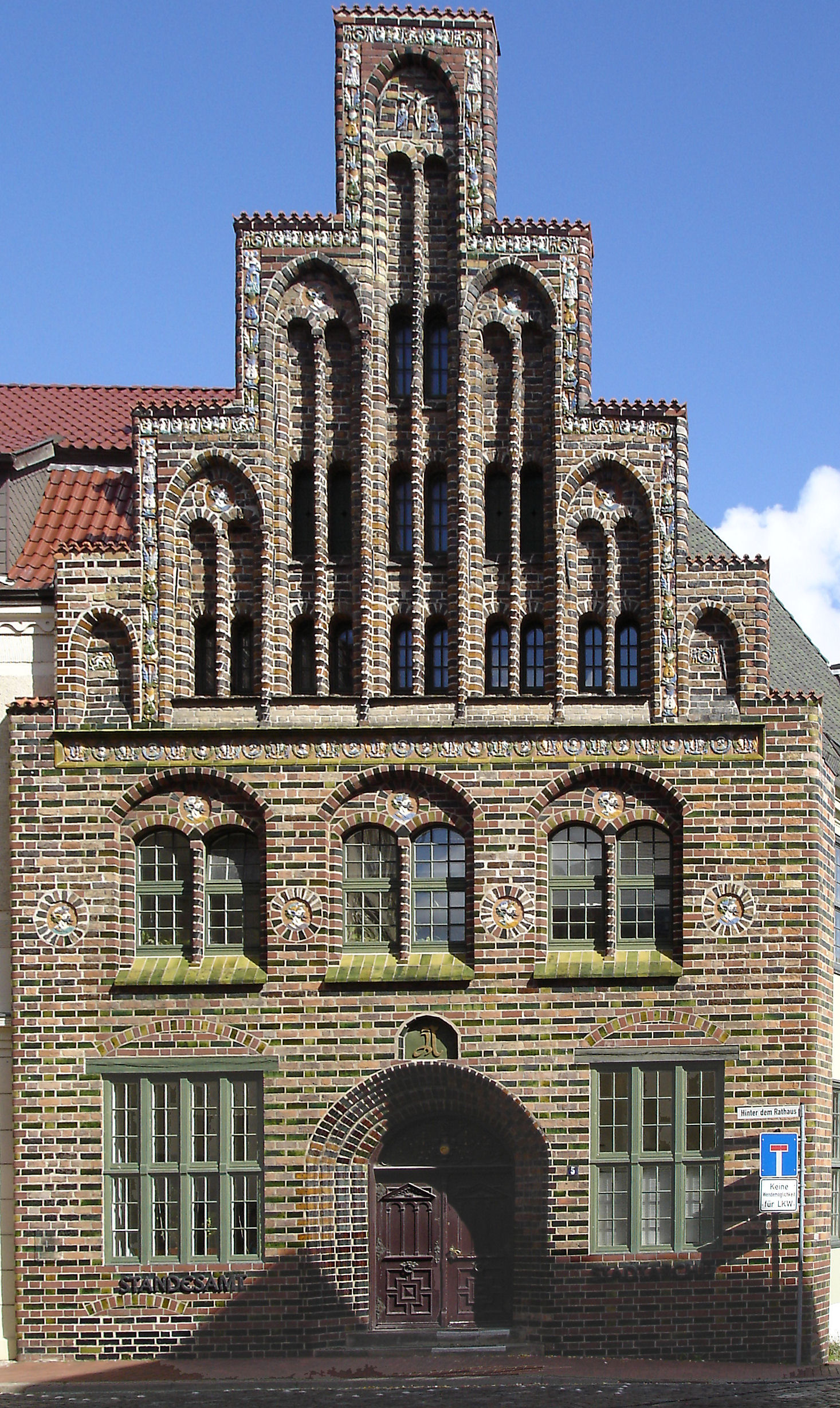
Rostock − Brick Gothic gable house

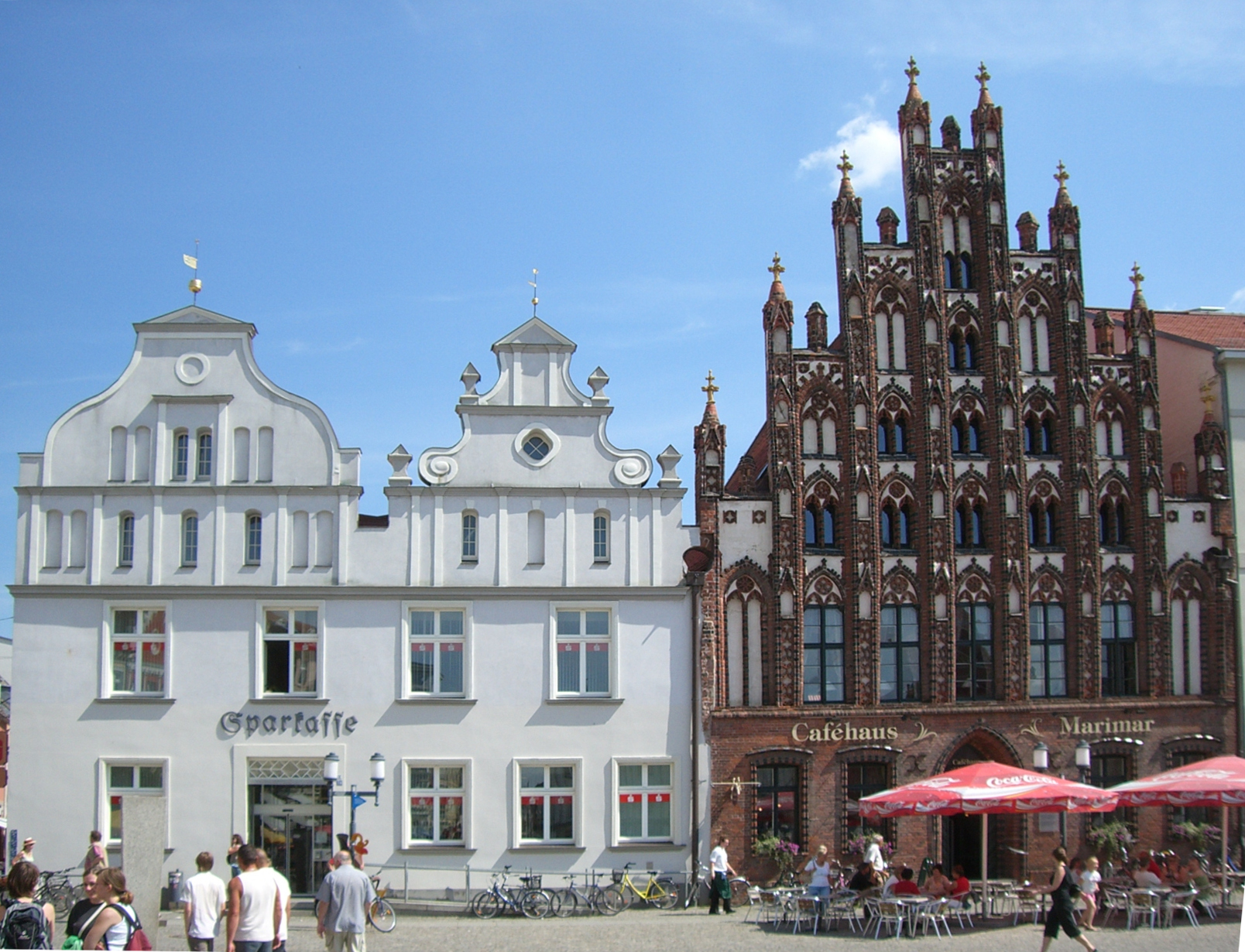
Greifswald − Gable houses at market square

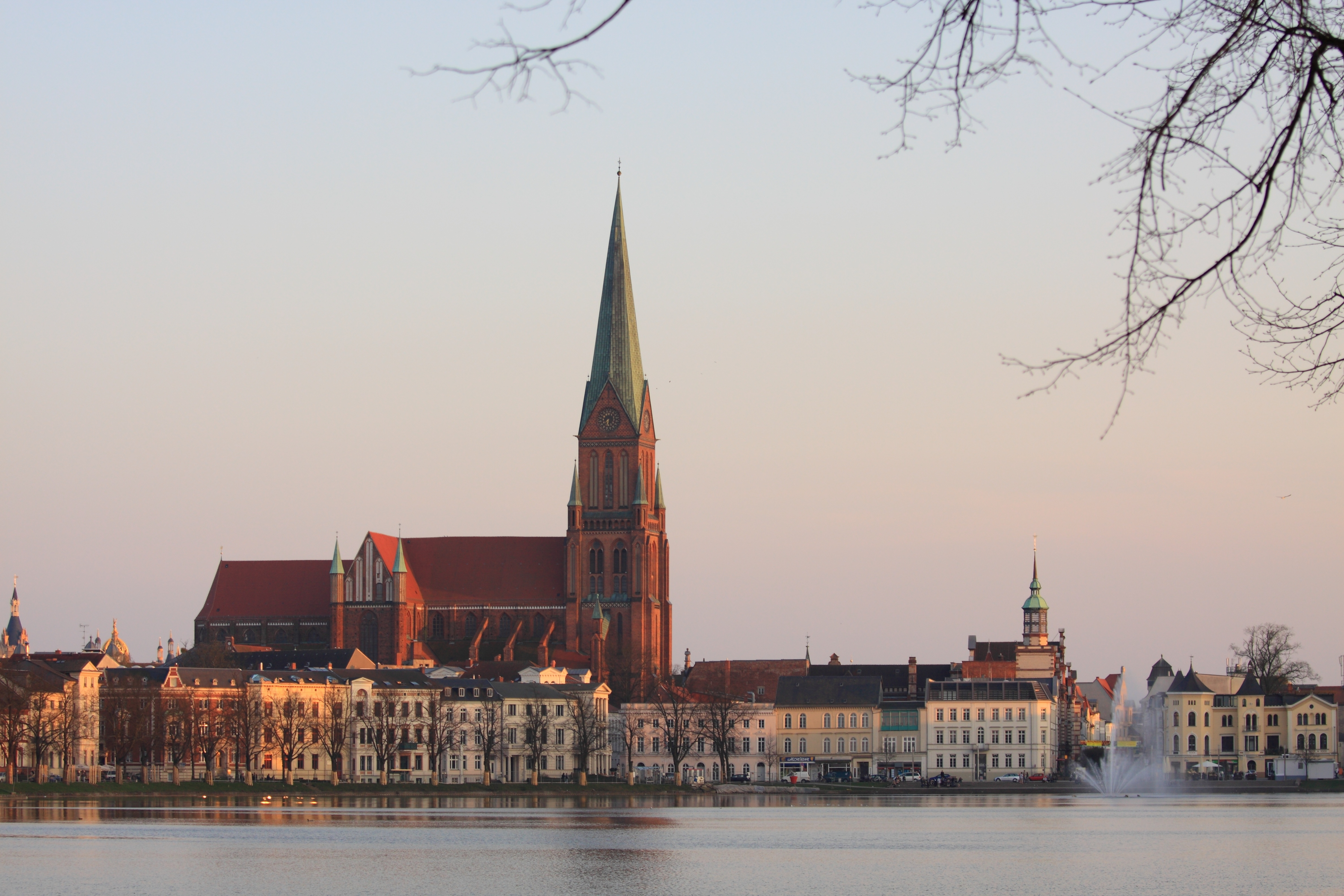
Schwerin − capital of Mecklenburg-Vorpommern

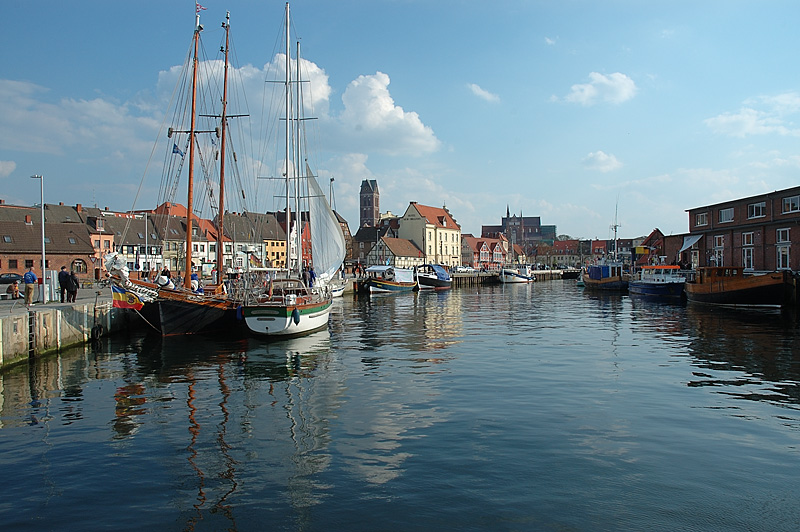
Harbour of Wismar, a historical Hanseatic city sharing its World Heritage Site status with Stralsund

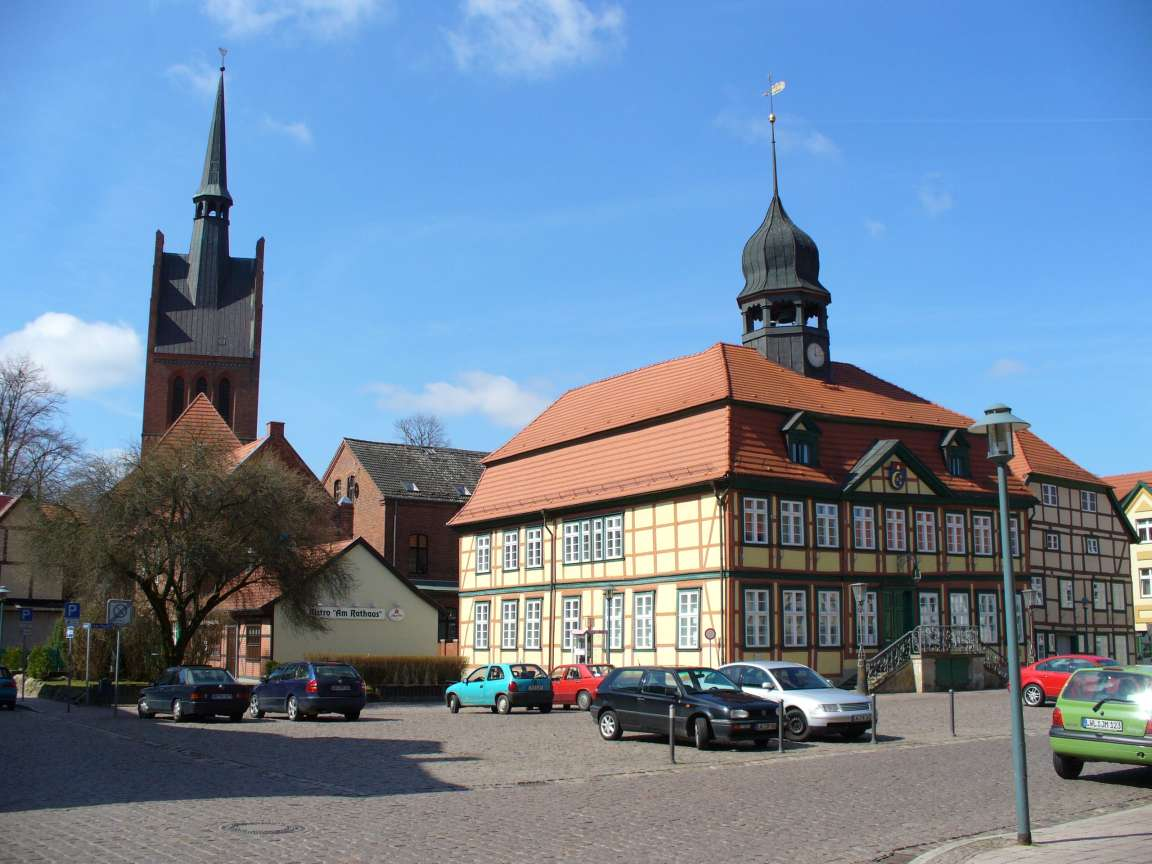
Grabow − Half timbered town hall

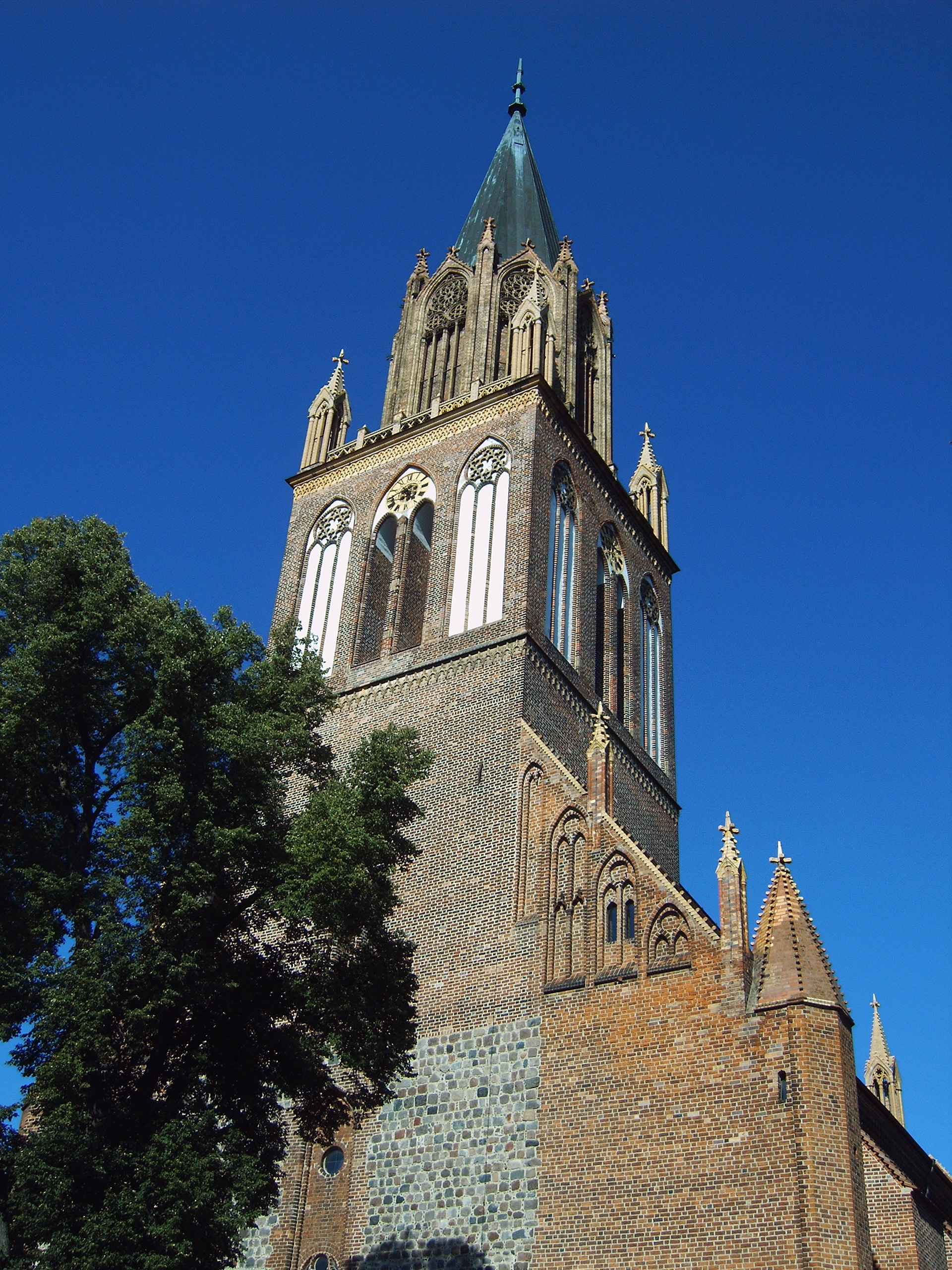
Neubrandenburg − Concert Church St. Marien

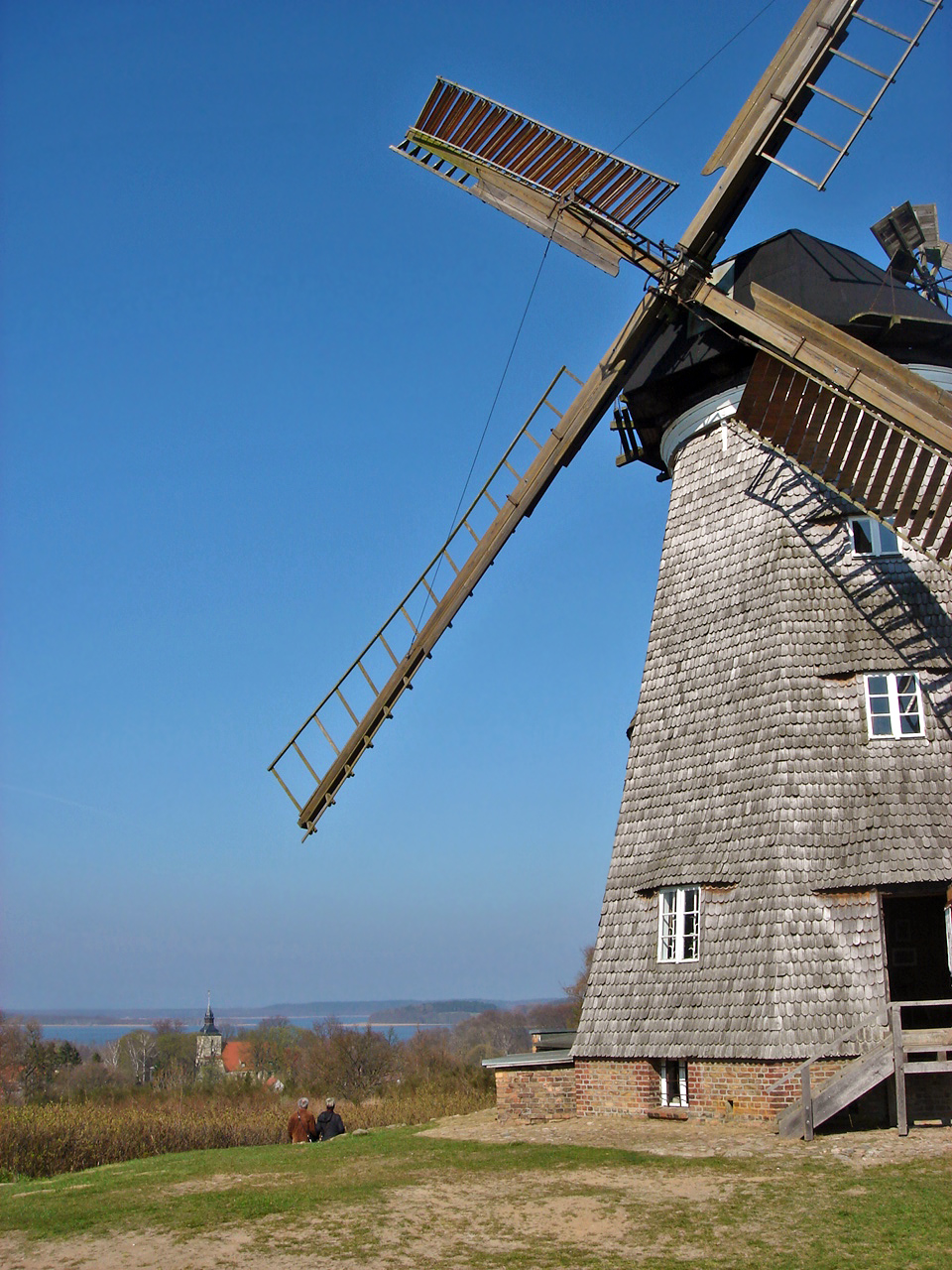
Usedom − Benz windmill, one of many windmills in MV

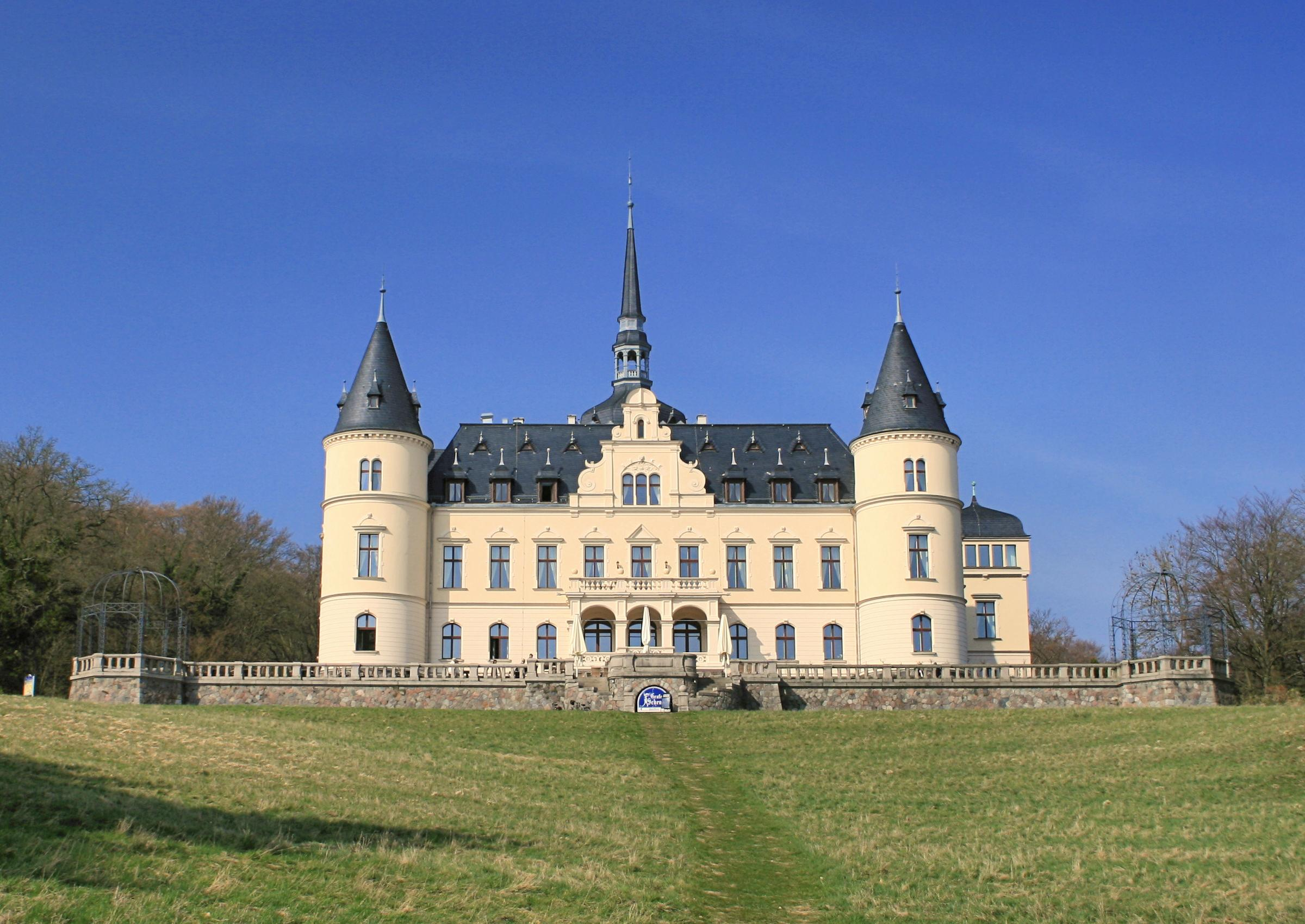
Rügen − Ralswiek castle, one of many castles in MV

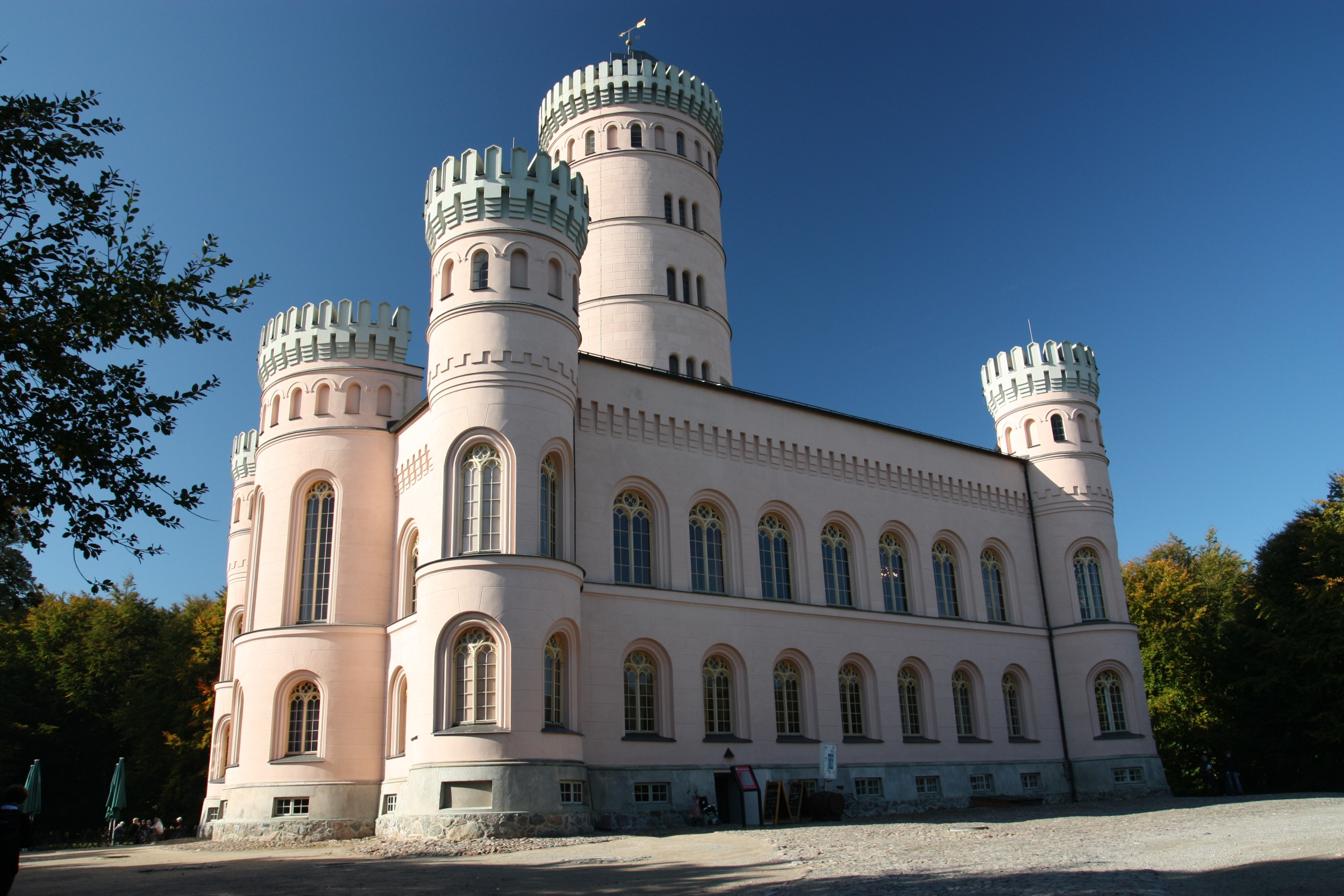
Rügen − Granitz Hunting Castle near Binz

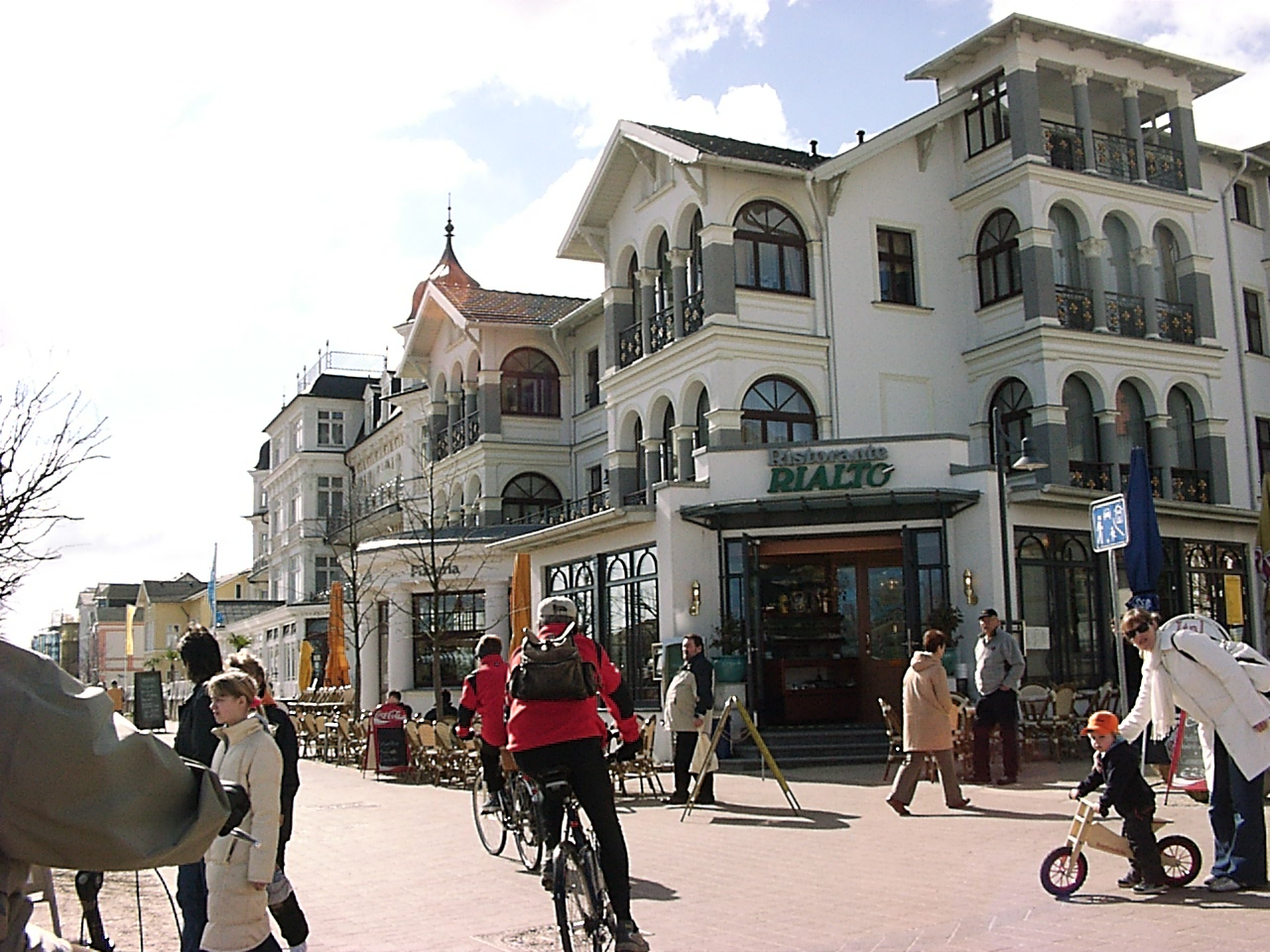
Ahlbeck − Hotel "Ahlbecker Hof" (Usedom Island)

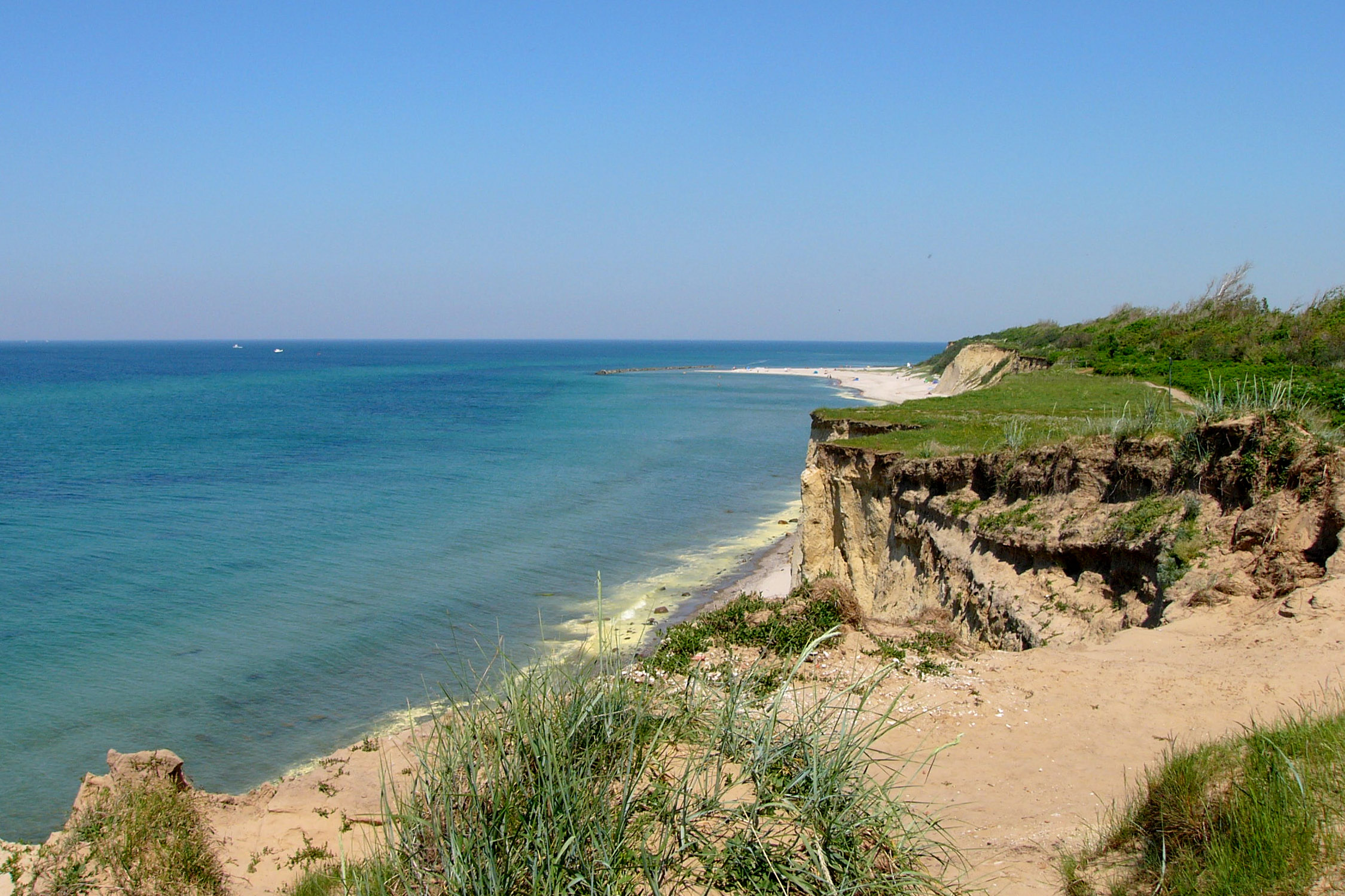
Ahrenshoop − steep coast, peninsula of Fischland-Darß-Zingst

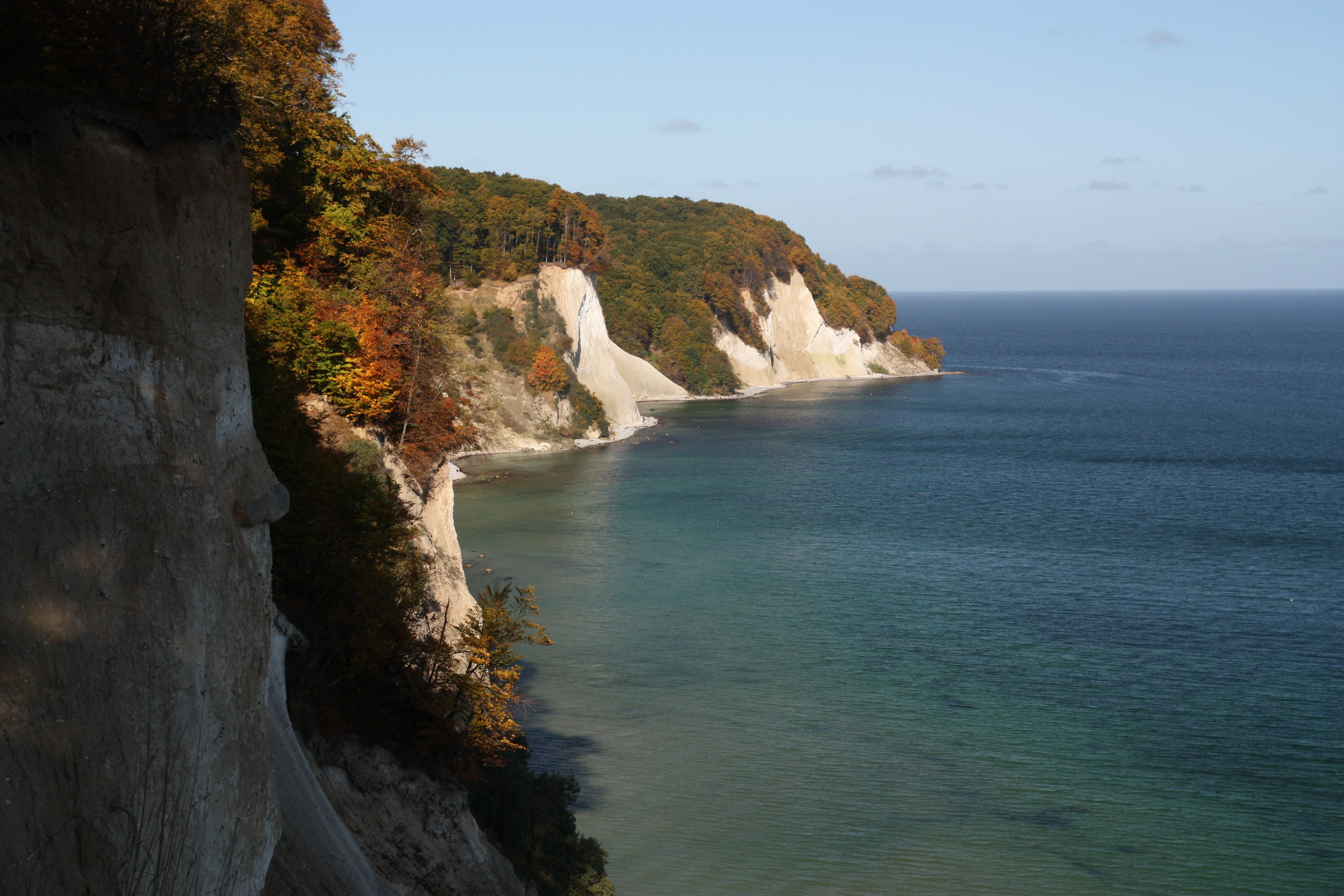
Rügen Island − Jasmund National Park

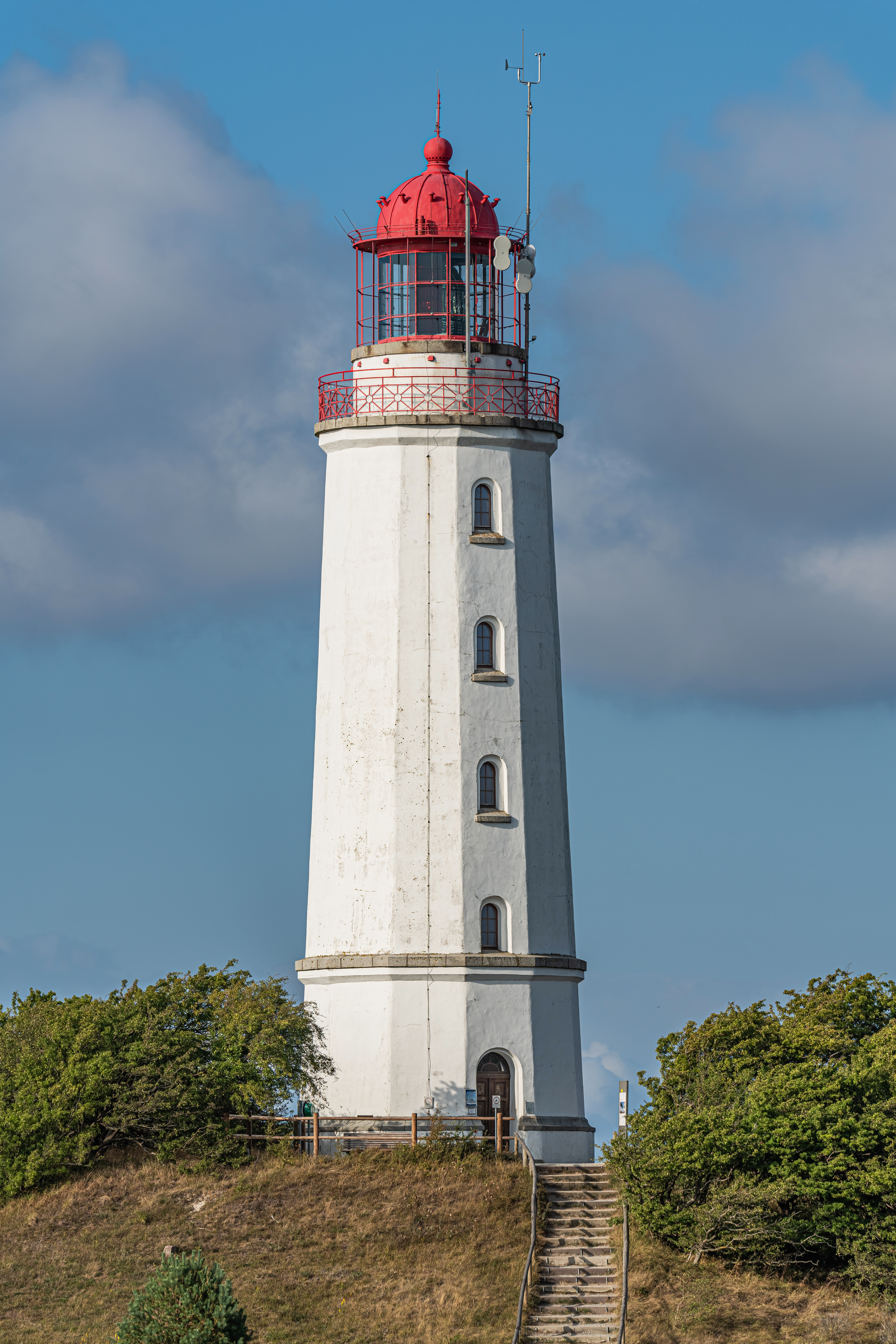
Hiddensee Island − Dornbusch Lighthouse

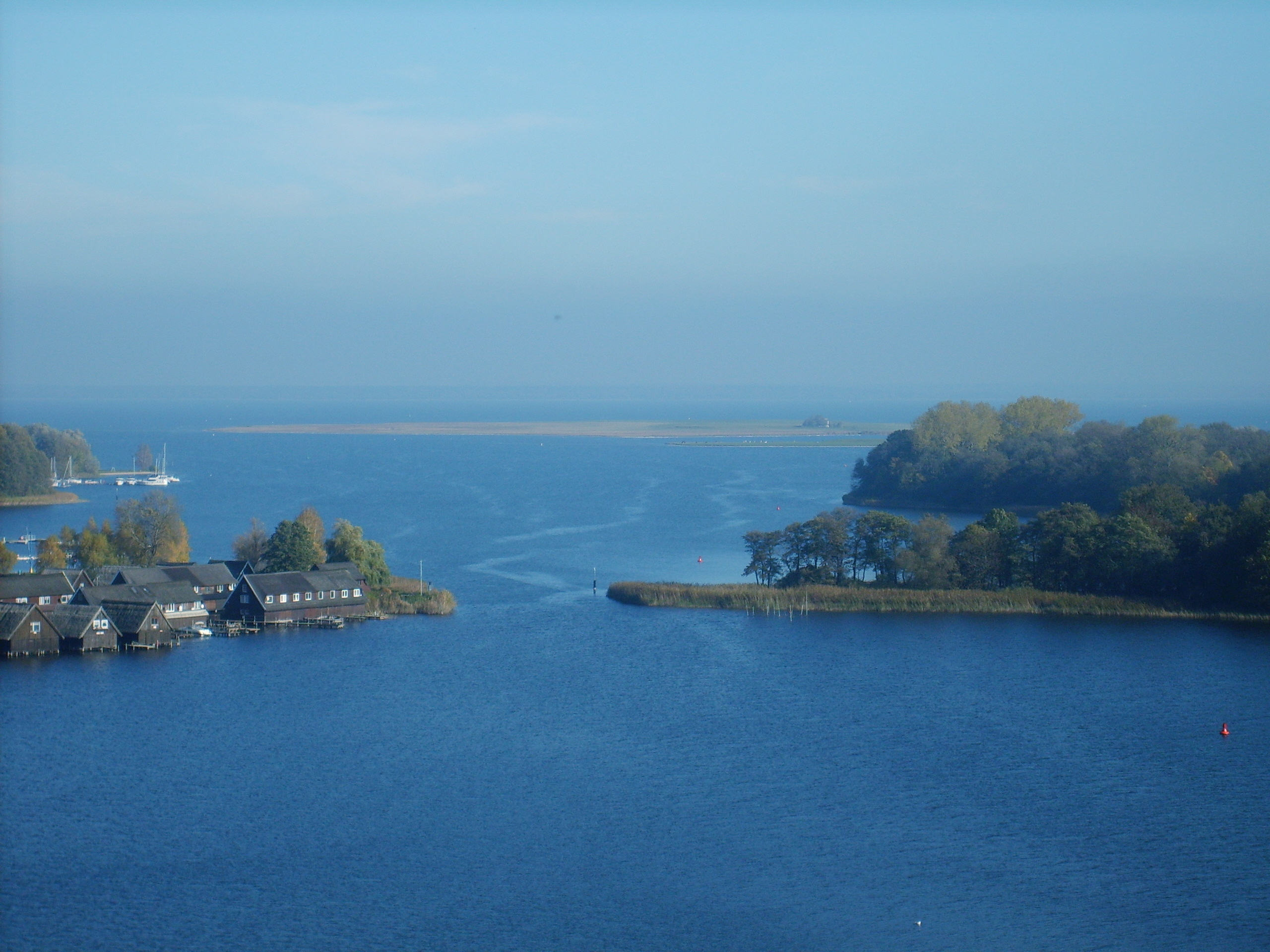
Müritz Lake − near Röbel

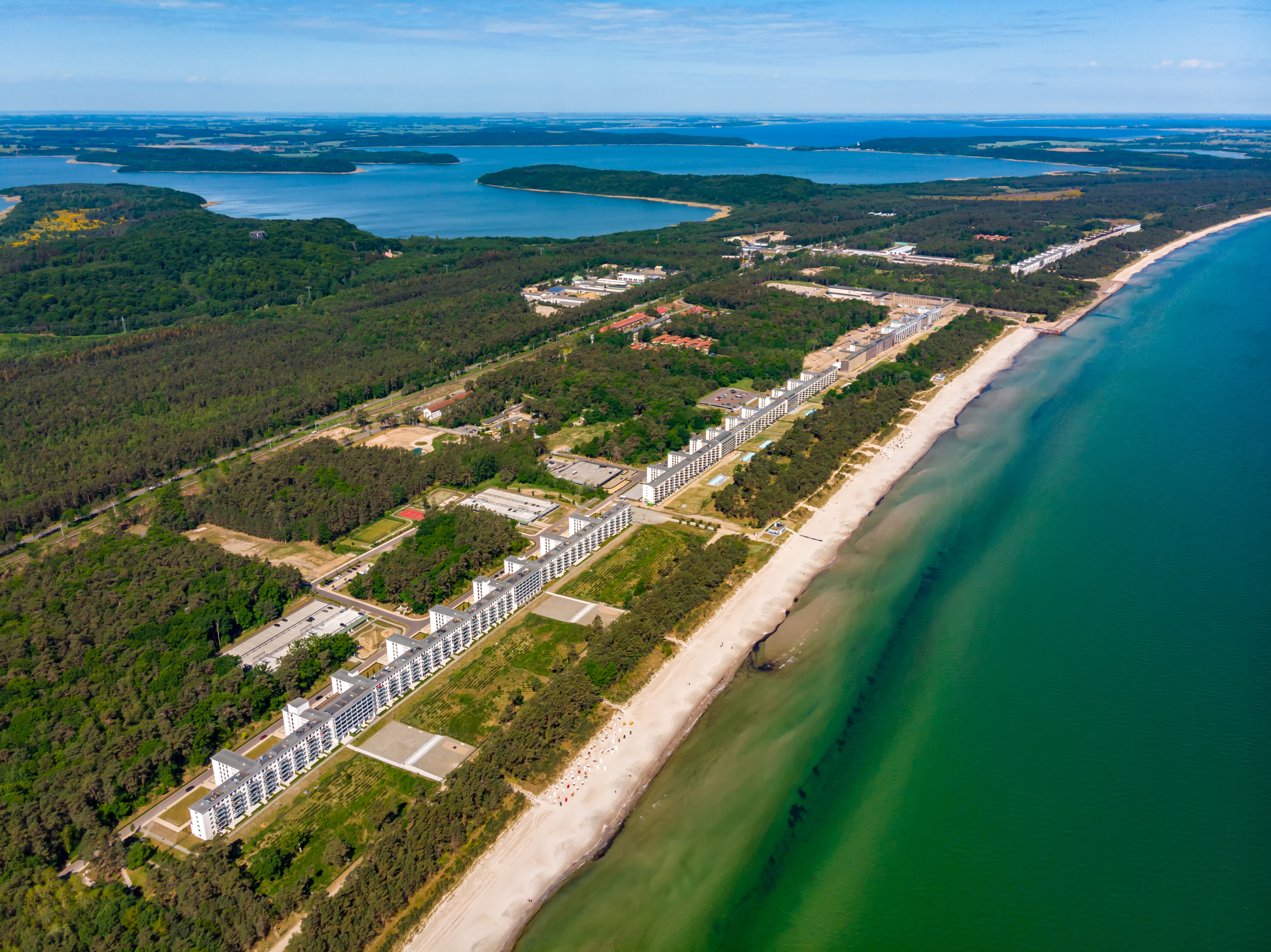
Prora on Rügen

== See also ==
- History of Pomerania
- List of places in Mecklenburg-Vorpommern
- List of towns in Vorpommern
- Mecklenburg
- Pomerania
