= Vehicle registration plates of the German Democratic Republic =

Vehicle registration plates were issued in the former German Democratic Republic between 1953 and 1990. Vehicles whose cylinder capacity was less than 50 cm^{3} were exempt from registration. The plates remained legal until the end of 1993, when all vehicles had to be re-registered to the West German system.

== Design ==
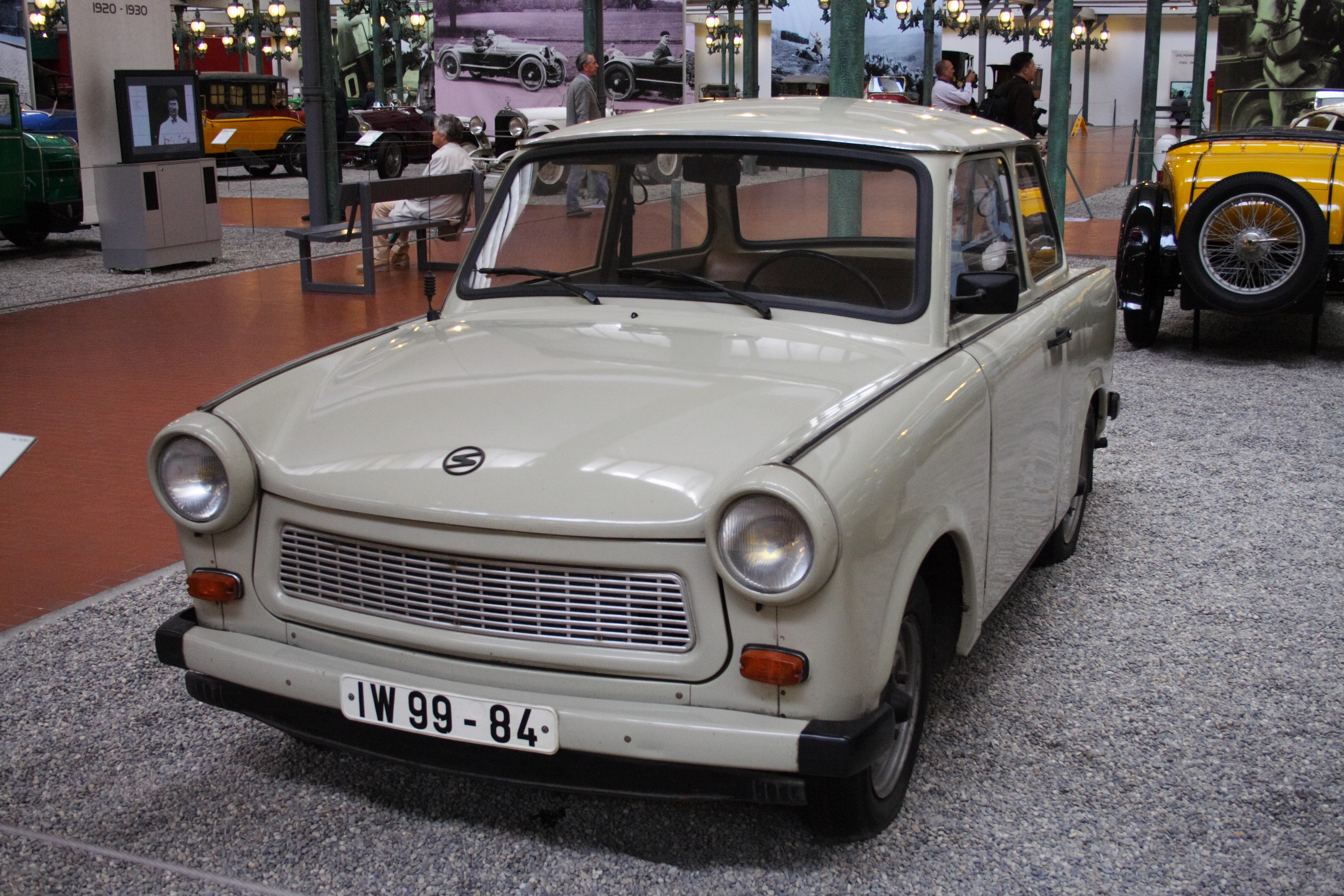
Trabant 601 registered in East Berlin

The plates' appearance remained largely constant during the 37 years in which they were issued. Black alphanumerics rendered in a condensed version of DIN 1451 were used (although other fonts have also been observed), with the first letter indicating the bezirk (the German word for 'district') where the vehicle was registered. Between 1953 and 1974, the format of these plates was XX ##-##, where X is any letter in the range A-Z, and # is a digit between 0 and 9 – although a numerical prefix and/or suffix of '00' was disallowed.

In response to the dramatic increase in the number of vehicles on East German roads, the design was revised in October 1974 to include an additional serial letter, albeit at the cost of the initial digit. The new format became: XXX #-##. Under this system, '0' was a permitted prefix digit, but the combination '0-00' was disallowed.

== List of district identifiers ==
The prefixes were allocated alphabetically to each region, from North to South. The letters G, J, Q, and W were not used.

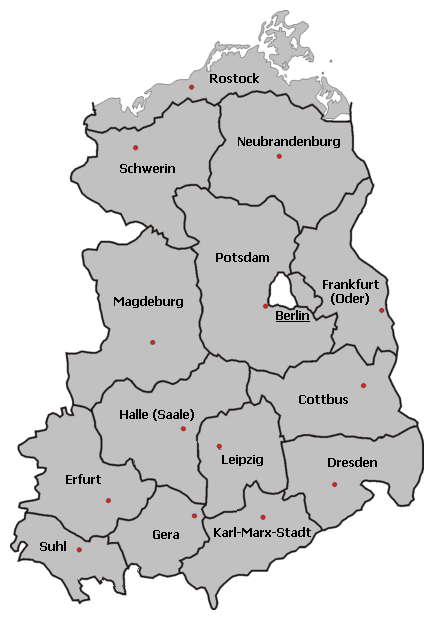
Districts (Bezirke) of the GDR

Prefix	Bezirk
A	Rostock
B	Schwerin
C	Neubrandenburg
D, P	Potsdam
E	Frankfurt
F, L	Erfurt
H, M	Magdeburg
I	East Berlin
K, V	Halle
N	Gera
O	Suhl
R, Y	Dresden
S, U	Leipzig
T, X	Karl-Marx-Stadt
Z	Cottbus

The prefixes HJ, KZ, SA, and SS were not issued, due to their Nazi connotations.

== Special Plates ==
=== GST ===
GST plate issued in Karl-Marx-Stadt

Vehicles belonging to the Gesellschaft für Sport und Technik (en: Sport and Technology Association), or GST for short, were allocated plates with only a single prefix letter denoting the district of registration.

=== Military ===
Vehicles belonging to the Nationale Volksarmee (en: National People's Army) were issued plates bearing the VA (Volksarmee) prefix, whilst those of the Grenztruppen (en: Border Troops), and Grenzschutz (as of 1990) received the GT and GS prefixes, respectively.

=== Volkspolizei ===
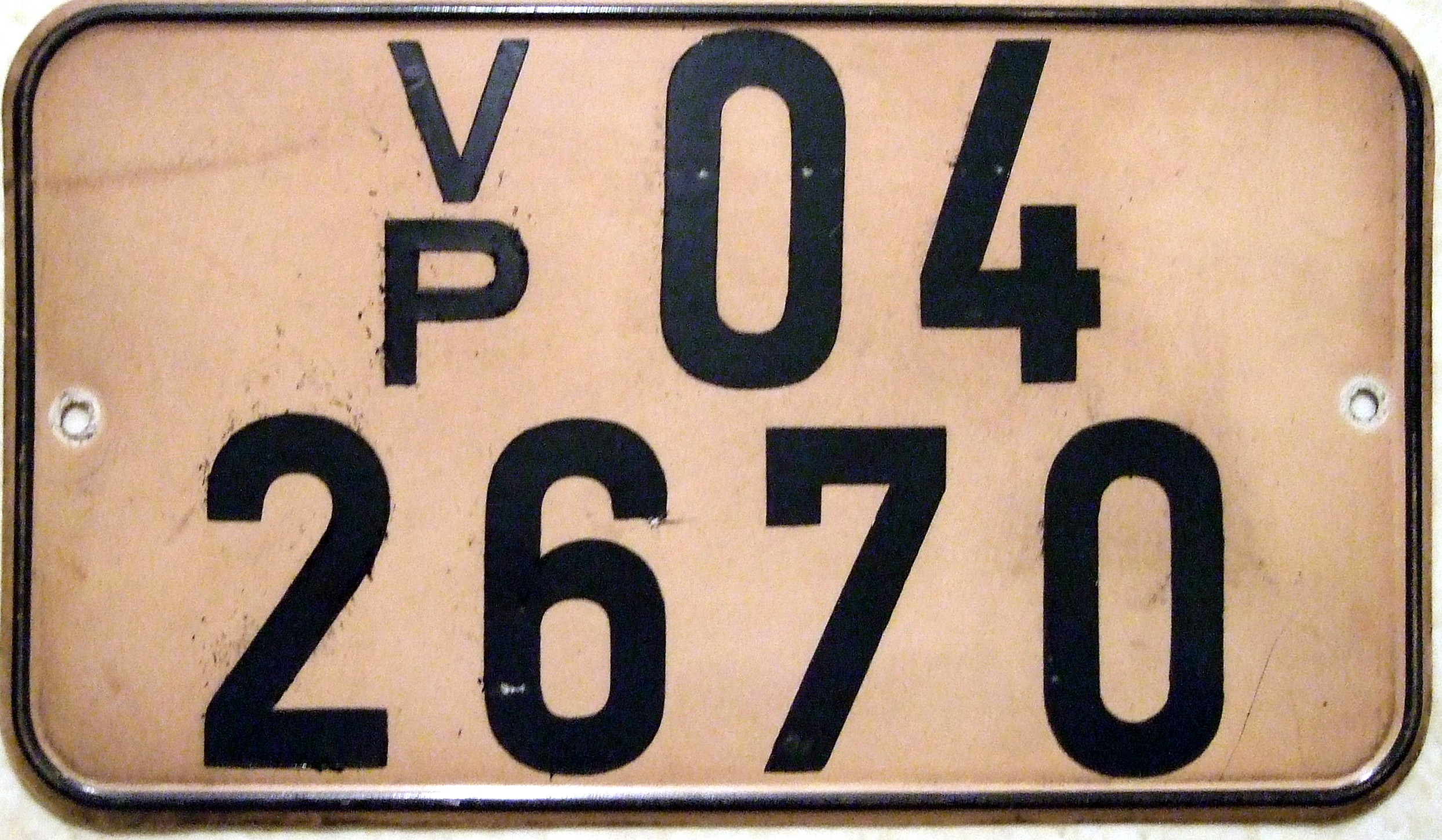
Militia plate issued in Potsdam

Vehicles of the Volkspolizei were furnished with plates bearing the VP prefix. Although they were identical in appearance and format to other East German plates, Volkspolizei plates followed a different system.

The first two digits after the VP prefix identified the district (or bezirk) where the vehicle was stationed. Incidentally, these (and diplomatic registrations) were the only plates where it was legal to use '00' as prefix digits.

The table below illustrates the numerical codes used:

Code	Bezirk
00	East Berlin
01	Rostock
02	Schwerin
03	Neubrandenburg
04	Potsdam
05	Frankfurt
06	Cottbus
07	Magdeburg
08	Halle
09	Erfurt
10	Gera
11	Suhl
12	Dresden
13	Leipzig
14	Karl-Marx-Stadt

=== Diplomatic & Foreign National ===
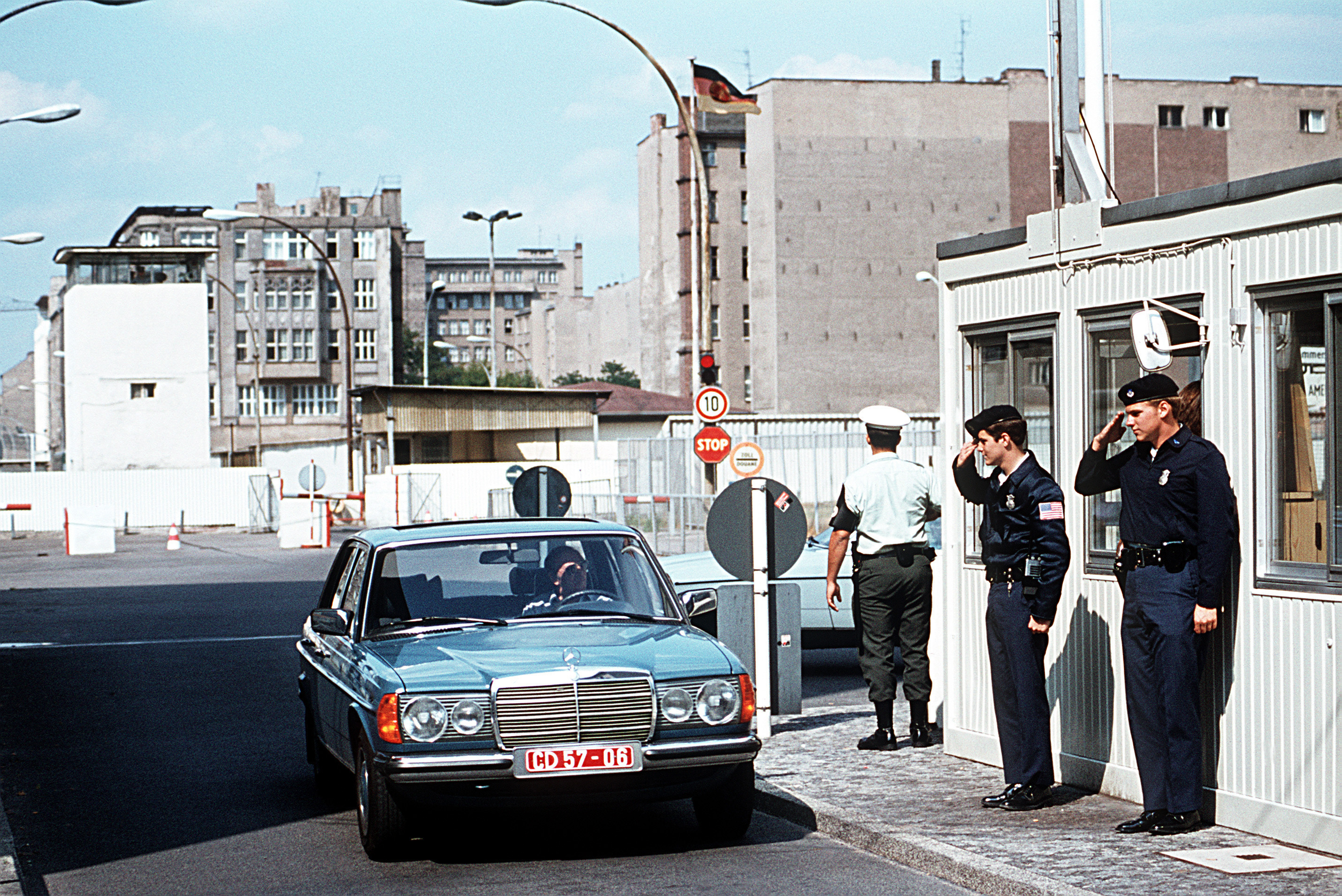
Mercedes-Benz bearing plates for the West German diplomatic mission crosses Checkpoint Charlie.

Vehicles belonging to diplomats and embassy staff were issued plates which featured white alphanumerics on a reddish-brown background, whilst those of foreign nationals were the more familiar white-on-blue. In both cases, the two-letter prefix identified the vehicle's function, whilst the first two digits indicated the country it belonged to. Diplomatic plates always began with the letter C, whilst those assigned to foreigners were prefixed with Q.

The following table lists these prefixes:

Prefix	Allocation
CC	Consular staff
CD	Diplomatic missions and their personnel
CY	Technical and administrative staff
QA	Foreign correspondents
QB, QX	Foreign trade offices, commercial offices, and industrial agencies
QC	Travel agencies, airlines, culture and information centres
QD	Others

List of numerical embassy codes:

Code	Country/Organisation
00	Comecon
01	Soviet Union
02	Czechoslovakia
03	Hungary
04	Poland
05	Romania
06	Bulgaria
07	People's Republic of China
08	Albania
09	Finland
10	Mongolia
11	North Korea
12	North Vietnam
13	Egypt
14	Yugoslavia
15	Cuba
16	South Vietnam
17	Syria
18	North Yemen
19	Mali
20	Guinea
21	Iraq
22	Cambodia
23	Sudan
24	South Yemen
25	India
26	People's Republic of the Congo
30	Algeria
31	Bangladesh
32	Burma
33	Switzerland
34	Italy
35	Denmark
36	Tunisia
37	Belgium
38	Sweden
39	France
40	Pakistan
41	Great Britain
42	Peru
43	Austria
44	Spain
45	Netherlands
46	Norway
47	Mexico
48	Indonesia
49	Lebanon
50	Iran
51	Japan
52	Argentina
53	Zaire
54	Brazil
55	Uruguay
56	Colombia
57	West Germany
58	Ghana
59	Portugal
60	Ecuador
61	United States
62	Turkey
63	Greece
64	Venezuela
65	Australia
66	Panama
67	Somalia
68	Libya
69	Ethiopia
70	PLO
71	Afghanistan
72	Nicaragua
73	Cape Verde
74	Philippines
75	Nigeria
76	Costa Rica
77	Guinea-Bissau
78	Laos
79	Zimbabwe
80	Mozambique
81	Angola
82	Bolivia
83	Morocco
91	France (trade delegations)
92	Austria (trade delegations)
93-96	Other accredited diplomatic missions in the GDR
99	Allocated to non-accredited diplomatic missions in the GDR
