= List of minister-presidents of Mecklenburg-Vorpommern =

This is a list of the people who have served in the capacity of minister-president or equivalent office in the states within the region of Mecklenburg from the 18th century to 1952. The states in question were Duchy and Grand Duchy of Mecklenburg-Schwerin, Duchy and Grand Duchy of Mecklenburg-Strelitz, Free States of Mecklenburg-Schwerin and Mecklenburg-Strelitz and unified state of Mecklenburg.

In 1990, with German reunification, the state was re-established as Mecklenburg-Vorpommern.

== Mecklenburg-Schwerin ==
=== Duchy ===
Prime ministers

- 1783–1784: Carl Friedrich Graf von Bassewitz
- 1784–1800: Stephan Werner von Dewitz auf Cölpin
- 1800–1808: Bernhard Friedrich Graf von Bassewitz
- 1808–1815: August Georg Freiherr von Brandenstein

=== Grand Duchy ===
Prime ministers

- 1815–1836: August Georg Freiherr von Brandenstein
- 1836–1837: Leopold Engelke von Plessen
- 1837–1840: Christian Friedrich Krüger
- 1840–1850: Ludwig von Lützow

Presidents of the State Ministry

- 1850–1858: Hans Adolf Karl Graf von Bülow
- 1858–1869: Jasper Joachim Bernhard Wilhelm von Oertzen
- 1869–1885: Henning Carl Friedrich Graf von Bassewitz
- 1886–1901: Alexander Friedrich Wilhelm von Bülow
- 1901–1914: Karl Heinrich Ludwig Graf von Bassewitz-Levetzow
- 1914–1918: Adolf Ferdinand Helmut August Wilhelm Langfeld

=== Free State ===
Political party: DDP DVP SPD DNVP NSDAP

Portrait	Name (Birth–Death)	Term of office			Political party
Portrait	Name (Birth–Death)	Took office	Left office	Days	Political party
President of the State Ministry
	Hugo Wendorff (1864–1945)	9 November 1918	22 February 1919	105	German Democratic Party
Ministers-President
	Hugo Wendorff (1864–1945)	22 February 1919	28 July 1920	522	German Democratic Party
	Hermann Reincke-Bloch (1867–1928)	28 July 1920	14 January 1921	170	German People's Party
	Johannes Stelling (1877–1933)	14 January 1921	18 March 1924	1159	Social Democratic Party of Germany
	Joachim Freiherr von Brandenstein (1864–1941)	18 March 1924	8 July 1926	842	German National People's Party
	Paul Schröder (1875–1932)	8 July 1926	10 July 1929	1098	Social Democratic Party of Germany
	Karl Eschenburg (1877–1943)	10 July 1929	13 July 1932	1099	German National People's Party
	Walter Granzow (1887–1952)	13 July 1932	10 August 1933	393	National Socialist German Workers' Party
	Hans Egon Engell (1897–1974)	10 August 1933	31 December 1933	143	National Socialist German Workers' Party
	Friedrich Hildebrandt (1898–1948)	Reichsstatthalter		219	National Socialist German Workers' Party
	Friedrich Hildebrandt (1898–1948)	26 May 1933	31 December 1933	219	National Socialist German Workers' Party

== Mecklenburg-Strelitz ==
=== Duchy (1769–1815) ===
Ministers of state (Staatsminister)

- 1769–1784: Stephan Werner von Dewitz auf Cöpin
- 1784–1795: Christoph Otto von Gamm
- 1795–1800: Otto Ulrich von Dewitz
- 1800–1815: Karl Wilhelm Friedrich David von Pentz

=== Grand Duchy (1815–1918) ===
- 1815–1827: Karl Wilhelm Friedrich David von Pentz
- 1827–1836: August Otto Ernst Freiherr von Örtzen auf Klokow
- 1837–1848: Otto Ludwig Christian von Dewitz auf Sallnow
- 1848–1850: Vacant
- 1850–1861: August Ludwig Wilhelm von Bernstorff
- 1862–1868: Bernhard Ernst von Bülow
- 1868–1872: Wilhelm Karl Konrad Freiherr von Hammerstein-Loxten
- 1872–1885: Anton von Piper (acting)
- 1885–1907: Friedrich Wilhelm Otto Ulrich Karl Helmut von Dewitz
- 1907–1918: Heinrich Bossart

=== Free State (1918-1933) ===
Political party: DDP SPD DNVP NSDAP

Portrait	Name (Birth–Death)	Term of office			Political party
Portrait	Name (Birth–Death)	Took office	Left office	Days	Political party
Chairmen of the State Ministry
	Peter Franz Stubmann (1876–1962)	11 November 1918	7 January 1919	67	German Democratic Party
	Hans Krüger (1884–1933)	7 January 1919	13 October 1919	279	Social Democratic Party of Germany
Ministers of State
	Kurt Gustav Hans Otto Freiherr von Reibnitz (1877–1937); 1st term	13 October 1919	2 August 1923	1389	Social Democratic Party of Germany
	Karl Schwabe (1877–1938)	2 August 1923	13 March 1928	1685	German National People's Party
	Kurt Gustav Hans Otto Freiherr von Reibnitz (1877–1937); 2nd term	13 March 1928	12 April 1929	395	Social Democratic Party of Germany
	Kurt Häntzschel (1889–1941)	Reichskommissar		4	German Democratic Party
	Kurt Häntzschel (1889–1941)	12 April 1929	16 April 1929	4	German Democratic Party
	Kurt Gustav Hans Otto Freiherr von Reibnitz (1877–1937); 3rd term	16 April 1929	4 December 1931	962	Social Democratic Party of Germany
	Heinrich Wilhelm Ferdinand von Michael (1888–1942)	4 December 1931	27 May 1933	540	German National People's Party
	Fritz Stichtenoth (1895–1935)	27 May 1933	31 December 1933	218	National Socialist German Workers' Party
	Friedrich Hildebrandt (1898–1948)	Reichsstatthalter		219	National Socialist German Workers' Party
	Friedrich Hildebrandt (1898–1948)	26 May 1933	31 December 1933	219	National Socialist German Workers' Party

== Mecklenburg (1933–1952) ==
=== Nazi Germany (1933–1945) ===
Reichsstatthalter of the State of Mecklenburg

Portrait	Name (Birth–Death)	Term of office			Political party
Portrait	Name (Birth–Death)	Took office	Left office	Days	Political party
	Friedrich Hildebrandt (1898–1948) as Reichsstatthalter	1 January 1934	1 May 1945	4138	National Socialist German Workers' Party

Minister-President of the State of Mecklenburg

Portrait	Name (Birth–Death)	Term of office			Political party
Portrait	Name (Birth–Death)	Took office	Left office	Days	Political party
Nazi Germany (1933–1945)
	Hans Egon Engell (1897–1974)	1 January 1934	25 October 1934	297	National Socialist German Workers' Party
	Friedrich Scharf (1897–1974)	25 October 1934	1 May 1945	3841	National Socialist German Workers' Party

=== Soviet control / GDR (1945–1952) ===
Minister-President of the State of Mecklenburg

Political party: SED

Portrait	Name (Birth–Death)	Term of office			Political party
Portrait	Name (Birth–Death)	Took office	Left office	Days	Political party
Mecklenburg (1945–1949)
Soviet occupation zone in Allied-occupied Germany
1	Wilhelm Höcker (1886–1955)	9 December 1946	7 October 1949	1033	Socialist Unity Party
Mecklenburg (1949–1952)
State of the German Democratic Republic
(1)	Wilhelm Höcker (1886–1955)	7 October 1949	20 July 1951	651	Socialist Unity Party
2	Kurt Bürger (1894–1951)	20 July 1951	30 July 1951	10	Socialist Unity Party
3	Bernhard Quandt (1903–1999)	30 July 1951	23 July 1952	359	Socialist Unity Party
On 23 July 1952, Mecklenburg was abolished.

== Mecklenburg-Vorpommern (1990–present) ==
The minister-president of Mecklenburg-Vorpommern (German: Ministerpräsidentin des Landes Mecklenburg-Vorpommern), is the head of government of the German state of Mecklenburg-Vorpommern. The position was created in 1990 after German reunification. The former districts Rostock, Schwerin, Neubrandenburg and the northern part of Potsdam were merged into the new federal state of Mecklenburg-Vorpommern and the borders was redrawn.

The current and first female minister-president is Manuela Schwesig, since 2021 heading a coalition government between the Social Democrats and The Left. Schwesig succeeded Erwin Sellering in July 2017.

The office of the minister-president is known as the state chancellery (German: Staatskanzlei), and is located in the capital of Schwerin, along with the rest of the cabinet departments.

Minister-President of Mecklenburg-Vorpommern

Political party: CDU SPD

Portrait	Name (Born–Died)	Term of office			Political party	Cabinet
Portrait	Name (Born–Died)	Took office	Left office	Days	Political party	Cabinet
In accordance with the Unification Treaty, the designated state representative Martin Brick (CDU) served as head of government from 3 to 27 October 1990.
1	Alfred Gomolka (1942–2020)	27 October 1990	19 March 1992 resigned	1 year, 144 days	CDU	I
2	Berndt Seite (born 1940)	19 March 1992	3 November 1998	6 years, 229 days	CDU	I II
3	Harald Ringstorff (1939–2020)	3 November 1998	6 October 2008 resigned	9 years, 338 days	SPD	I II III
4	Erwin Sellering (born 1949)	6 October 2008	4 July 2017 resigned	8 years, 271 days	SPD	I II III
5	Manuela Schwesig (born 1974)	4 July 2017	Incumbent	9 years, 135 days	SPD	I II III
