= Bernhard Quandt =

German politician (1903–1999)

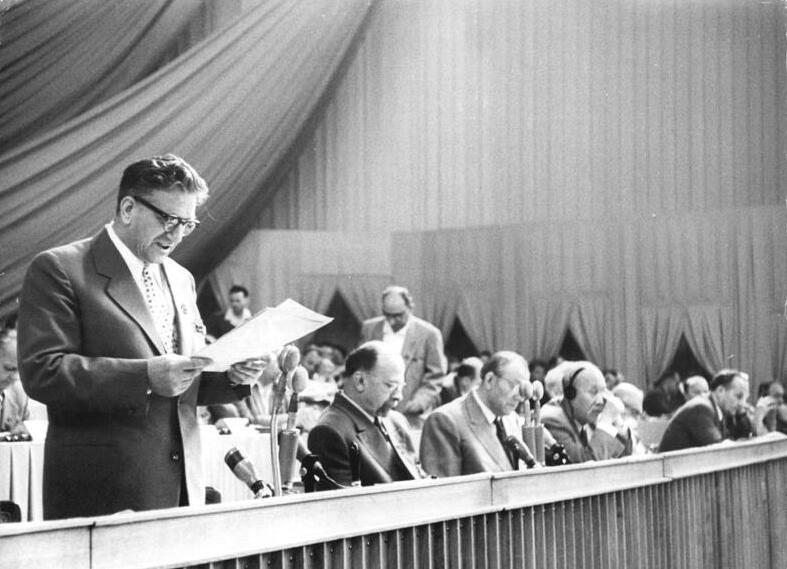
- Quandt in 1958

First Secretary of the Socialist Unity Party in Bezirk Schwerin
- In office 1 August 1952 – 28 January 1974
- Second Secretary: Heinz Bendig; Heinrich Mosler; Johann Raskop; Heinz Ziegner
- Preceded by: Karl Mewis (as First Secretary of the SED in Mecklenburg)
- Succeeded by: Heinz Ziegner

Minister-President of Mecklenburg
- In office 24 August 1951 – 23 July 1952
- Preceded by: Kurt Bürger
- Succeeded by: Position abolished
Mecklenburg Cabinet
Minister of Agriculture and Forestry (Note: as Minister of Agriculture from February 1948 to March 1949 and September to November 1950)
In office 10 February 1948 – 23 July 1952
Minister-President	Wilhelm Höcker; Kurt Bürger; himself
Preceded by	Otto Möller
Succeeded by	Position abolished
Volkskammer
Member of the Volkskammer for Schwerin-Stadt, Schwerin-Land, Gadebusch, Sternberg
In office 3 December 1958 – 5 April 1990
Preceded by	multi-member district
Succeeded by	Constituency abolished

Personal details
- Born: 14 April 1903 Rostock, Grand Duchy of Mecklenburg-Schwerin, German Empire (now Mecklenburg-Vorpommern, Germany)
- Died: 2 August 1999 (aged 96) Schwerin, Mecklenburg-Vorpommern, Germany
- Party: Party of Democratic Socialism (1989–1999)
- Other political affiliations: Socialist Unity Party (1946–1989); Communist Party of Germany (1923–1946); Social Democratic Party (1920–1923)
- Education: "Karl Marx" Party Academy
- Occupation: Politician; Party Functionary; Machinist
- Awards: Patriotic Order of Merit, 1st class; Banner of Labor; Order of Karl Marx; Star of Peoples' Friendship
- Central institution membership: 1958–1989: Full member, Central Committee; Other offices held: 1973–1989: Member, State Council; 1946–1948: Member, Landtag of Mecklenburg; 1946–1948: Second Secretary, Socialist Unity Party in Mecklenburg; 1945–1946: District Administrator, Güstrow district

Bernhard Quandt (14 April 1903 – 2 August 1999) was a German politician and party functionary of the Socialist Unity Party (SED).

Quandt became politically active in the waning years of the Weimar Republic for the Communist Party of Germany (KPD), spending several years in the Sachsenhausen and Dachau concentration camps during Nazi rule.

He moved to the Soviet occupation zone after the war, where he became a SED functionary. He served as the last Minister-President of Mecklenburg before its dissolution and thereafter as the longtime First Secretary of the Bezirk Schwerin SED before being forced into retirement in 1974.

== Life and career ==
=== Early life ===
Quandt was born to a single mother; his father was a soldier in the Imperial German Army who died in a riding accident in Parchim four months before Quandt's birth.

The family—his mother had since married a carpenter—lived in Rostock and Wismar. At six, he attended elementary school there. In 1912, the family moved to Gielow, where his mother ran a small farm. He began training as an iron turner in 1917 and worked as a journeyman.

=== Early political career ===
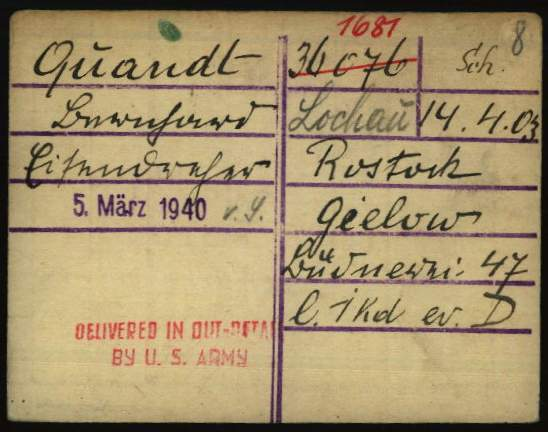
Quandt's Dachau Concentration Camp registration card

In 1920, he joined the Social Democratic Party of Germany (SPD) and worked in Hamburg from 1922, switching to the Communist Party of Germany (KPD) in 1923.

He became politically active, serving in 1927 as a municipal representative of Gielow and local leader of his party in Waren/Stavenhagen. He also briefly served as a member of the Landtag of the Free State of Mecklenburg-Schwerin on the eve of the Nazis' rise to power in 1932/1933. He held various jobs.

After the Nazis came to power in 1933, he was repeatedly detained and eventually interned from October 1939, first in the Sachsenhausen and from March 1940 in the Dachau concentration camp, where he was freed by French troops.

=== Mecklenburg ===
After the war, he became the First Secretary of the KPD in Güstrow and was appointed district administrator of Güstrow district by the Soviet Military Administration. In 1946, he became Second Secretary, also responsible for organization, of the Mecklenburg KPD, and after their forced merger with the SPD, of the Mecklenburg SED.

From February 1948, he served as Minister of Agriculture of Mecklenburg in the cabinets of Wilhelm Höcker and Kurt Bürger, succeeding Otto Möller, who left for a teaching position at the University of Rostock.

When Bürger died after only 8 days in office, Quandt was additionally made Minister-President of Mecklenburg in late August 1951, serving for just under one year before Mecklenburg's dissolution.

=== Bezirk Schwerin SED First Secretary ===
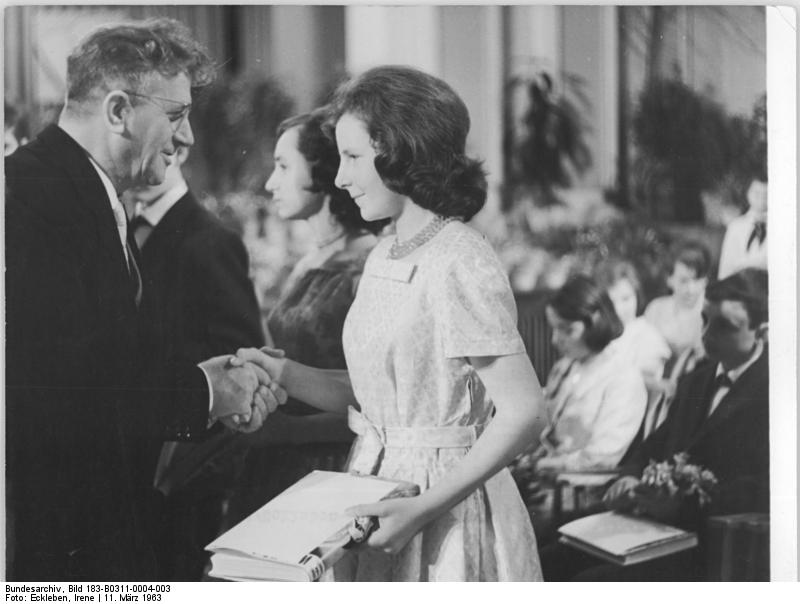
Quandt at a 1963 Jugendweihe

Following the dissolution of states in the GDR in 1952, Quandt became the First Secretary of the SED in Bezirk Schwerin, the second most populous of the three Bezirke created from Mecklenburg. Quandt additionally became a full member of the Central Committee of the SED in June (V. Party Congress), serving until its collective resignation in December 1989, and of the Volkskammer in December, nominally representing a constituency in the northwest of his Bezirk.

In October 1973, Quandt was also elected to the State Council, the GDR's collective head of state, succeeding the deceased Walter Ulbricht.

During his time as First Secretary, Quandt successfully opposed the SED Politburo's decisions to construct multi-story prefabricated housing developments in rural areas, as he believed they would "ruin" the traditional village landscape. He was a supporter of land reform and the new farmer program.

Quandt was awarded the Patriotic Order of Merit in silver in 1955, the honor clasp to this order in 1969, the Banner of Labor in 1965, the Order of Karl Marx in 1973 and 1988 and the Star of Peoples' Friendship in 1978.

=== Retirement ===
In January 1974, on the instigation of party leadership, Quandt was forced into retirement. On 28 January 1974, Heinz Ziegner, his Second Secretary, was appointed as the new First Secretary.

Quandt was allowed to remain in the Central Committee, Volkskammer and State Council, but was transferred to a politically irrelevant position at the Committee of Antifascist Resistance Fighters, a SED-controlled mass organization, chairing their Bezirk Schwerin Committee from 1974 to 1989.

=== Peaceful Revolution ===
At the last session of the Central Committee on 3 December 1989, he tearfully called for the reintroduction of the death penalty and the summary execution of all those (the "criminal gang of the old Politburo") who had brought disgrace (referring to the loss of power due to the revolutionary events in autumn 1989) upon the party (SED). "We abolished the death penalty in the State Council. I am in favor of reintroducing it and summarily executing everyone who brought such disgrace upon our party!"

In 1990, he was elected to the Council of Elders of the now-renamed SED-PDS.

Quandt died in 1999 at the age of 96, as the last former Minister-President of a GDR state.
