= Ländereinführungsgesetz =

The Ländereinführungsgesetz (English: State Establishment Act), adopted on 22 July 1990 by the Volkskammer recreated the Länder in the German Democratic Republic where they had been abolished in 1952. Since the new länder were formed by merging the kreise of East Germany, their borders differ from the ones of 1947. Originally, it was supposed to come into force on 14 October, the date of the first state elections in the new states. Eventually, this date was changed to 3 October, the date of reunification, by the Unification treaty.

The act also was supposed to regulate the relationship of the state and the federal level. As, however, it did not come into force before reunification, these parts of the act were immediately superseded by the corresponding articles of the Basic Law and never had any significance.

The full official title of the act is Verfassungsgesetz zur Bildung von Ländern in der Deutschen Demokratischen Republik (English: Constitutional Law for the Creation of States in the German Democratic Republic)

== Composition of the newly created states ==
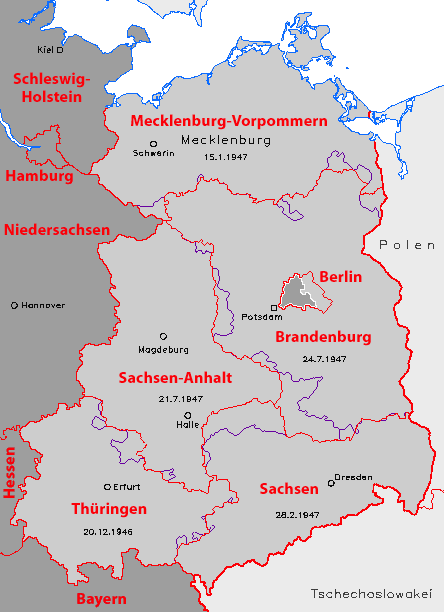
The borders of the states as formed after World War II are grey. The borders of states as they were 1990 are displayed red. In contrast to what is shown on the map, the eastern sector of Berlin was not part of the Soviet occupation zone in 1947 or the GDR in 1952, and in 1990 it was not one of the five new federal states.

State	Previous Bezirke	Without the Kreise	Plus the Kreise	Notes
Mecklenburg-Vorpommern	Neubrandenburg	Prenzlau and Templin	–	Not retained as a Regierungsbezirk
Mecklenburg-Vorpommern	Rostock	–	–	Not retained as a Regierungsbezirk
Mecklenburg-Vorpommern	Schwerin	Perleberg	–	Not retained as a Regierungsbezirk
Brandenburg	Cottbus	Hoyerswerda, Jessen and Weißwasser	–	Not retained as a Regierungsbezirk
Brandenburg	Frankfurt/Oder	–	Prenzlau and Templin	Not retained as a Regierungsbezirk
Brandenburg	Potsdam	–	Perleberg	Not retained as a Regierungsbezirk
Saxony-Anhalt	Halle	Artern	Jessen	Divided into two Regierungsbezirke, Halle and Dessau
Saxony-Anhalt	Magdeburg	–	–	
Saxony	Dresden	–	Hoyerswerda and Weißwasser	
Saxony	Karl-Marx-Stadt/Chemnitz	–	–	
Saxony	Leipzig	Altenburg and Schmölln	–	
Thuringia	Erfurt	–	Artern	Not retained as a Regierungsbezirk
Thuringia	Gera	–	Altenburg and Schmölln	Not retained as a Regierungsbezirk
Thuringia	Suhl	–	–	Not retained as a Regierungsbezirk

== See also ==
- Administrative divisions of the German Democratic Republic
- New states of Germany
- Constitution of East Germany
