= 1946 Soviet occupation zone state elections =

Elections in soon-to-be Germany

- 20 October 1946
- Registered: 11,454,837
- Turnout: 91.0%
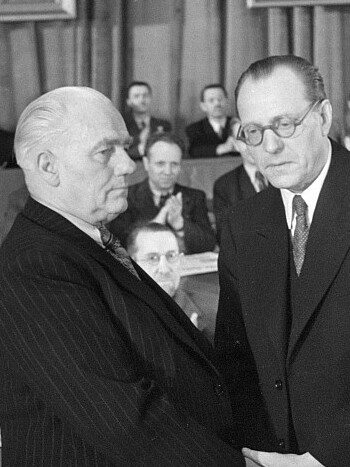

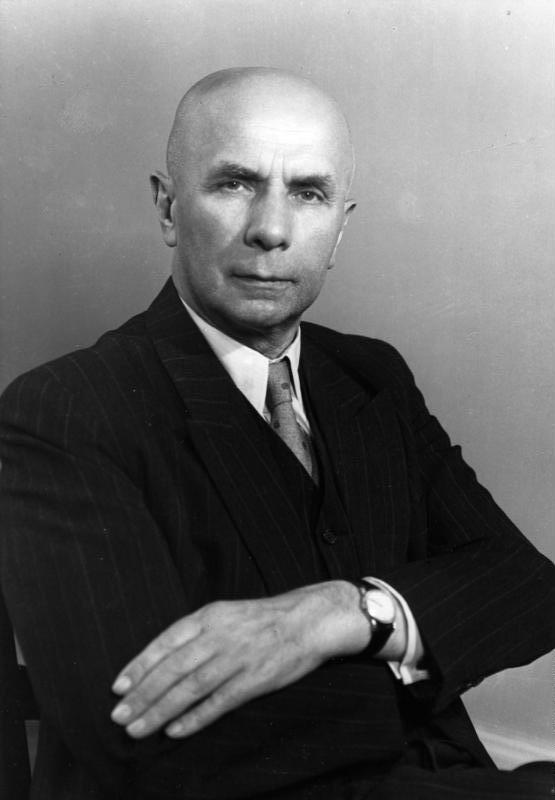

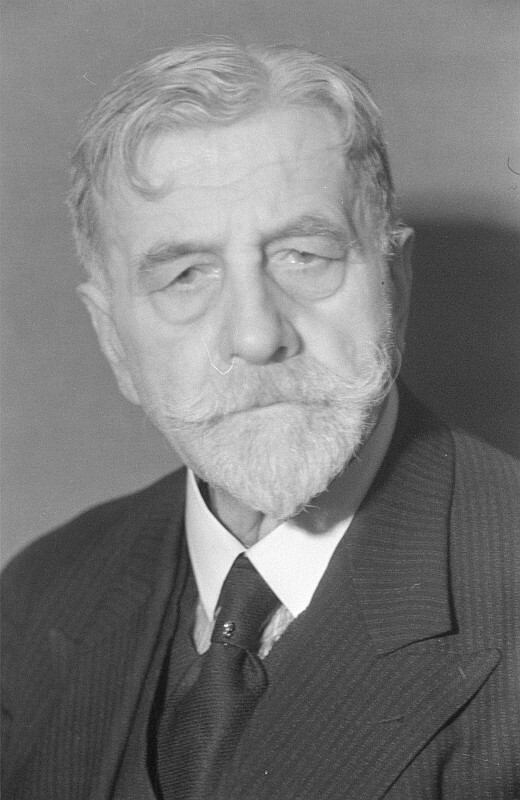

	Majority party	Minority party	Third party
Leader	Wilhelm Pieck and Otto Grotewohl	Jakob Kaiser	Wilhelm Külz
Party	SED	CDU	LDP
Seats won	249	133	121
Popular vote	4,685,304	2,411,033	2,418,841
Percentage	47.57%	24.48%	24.56%
	Fourth party	Fifth party	Sixth party
Party	VdgB	Kulturbund	Frauenausschüsse
Seats won	15	1	0
Popular vote	296,111	19,148	18,340
Percentage	3.01%	0.19%	0.19%

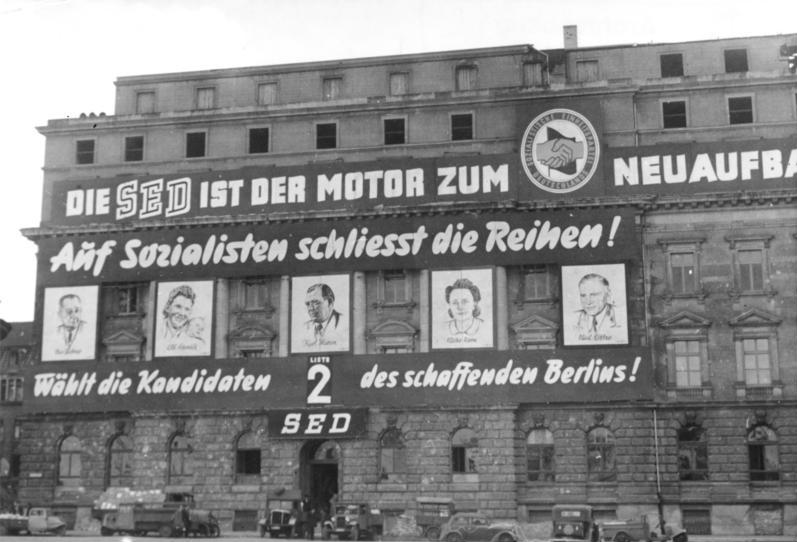
SED Electoral advertisement in East Berlin.

State elections were held in the Soviet occupation zone of Germany on 20 October 1946 to elect the state legislatures of Mecklenburg-Vorpommern, Brandenburg, Saxony, Saxony-Anhalt and Thuringia. They were the only elections held in the future territory of East Germany before the establishment of the German Democratic Republic in 1949, and the only free and fair elections in that part of Germany between 1932 and the Peaceful Revolution.

The Socialist Unity Party of Germany (SED), which was formed by the forced merger of the Communist Party and the Social Democratic Party in the Soviet occupation zone, became the largest party, but did not achieve an absolute majority in any state. The SED was created in view of the holding of elections in the Soviet zone, as a first step for future political reforms.

In addition to the SED, three other parties participated; the Christian Democratic Union (CDU), the Liberal Democratic Party (LDP) and the Peasants Mutual Aid Association (VdgB). Two other organizations participated but only in Saxony. The SED landslide victory was seen by Soviet authorities as a justification for the development of socialism in their zone. The occupation authorities quickly dropped all pretense of liberal democracy, and cajoled the other parties into forming a "coalition" in which only the SED had any real power. By the time of the elections for a constitutional assembly in 1949, voters only had the option of approving or rejecting a "unity list" put forward by the SED-dominated Democratic Bloc.

The next state elections were held in 1950, after the establishment of the German Democratic Republic.

== Results ==
=== Overall ===
Party	Votes		Votes (including East Berlin)		Seats
Party	Votes	%	Votes	%	Seats
Socialist Unity Party	4,685,304	47.57	4,918,762	46.27	249
Liberal Democratic Party	2,418,841	24.56	2,480,130	23.33	121
Christian Democratic Union	2,411,033	24.48	2,557,253	24.05	133
Social Democratic Party			341,400	3.21	–
Peasants Mutual Aid Association	296,111	3.01	296,111	2.79	15
Cultural Association	19,148	0.19	19,148	0.18	1
Women's Committees	18,340	0.19	18,340	0.17	0
Total	9,848,777	100.00	10,631,144	100.00	519
Valid votes	9,848,777	94.54	10,631,144	94.76	
Invalid/blank votes	569,279	5.46	588,004	5.24	
Total votes	10,418,056	100.00	11,219,148	100.00	
Registered voters/turnout	11,449,620	90.99	12,303,726	91.18	

=== East Berlin ===
Party	Votes	%
Social Democratic Party of Germany	341,400	43.64
Socialist Unity Party of Germany	233,458	29.84
Christian Democratic Union	146,220	18.69
Liberal Democratic Party of Germany	61,289	7.83
Total	782,367	100.00
Valid votes	782,367	97.66
Invalid/blank votes	18,725	2.34
Total votes	801,092	100.00
Registered voters/turnout	854,106	93.79
Source: Berliner Wahlergebnisse

=== Brandenburg ===
Party	Votes	%	Seats
Socialist Unity Party of Germany	634,786	43.52	44
Christian Democratic Union	442,206	30.32	31
Liberal Democratic Party of Germany	298,311	20.45	20
Peasants Mutual Aid Association	83,271	5.71	5
Total	1,458,574	100.00	100
Valid votes	1,458,574	96.21	
Invalid/blank votes	57,413	3.79	
Total votes	1,515,987	100.00	
Registered voters/turnout	1,655,980	91.55	
Source: Wahlen in Deutschland

=== Mecklenburg-Vorpommern ===
Party	Votes	%	Seats
Socialist Unity Party of Germany	551,594	49.53	45
Christian Democratic Union	379,829	34.10	31
Liberal Democratic Party of Germany	138,662	12.45	11
Peasants Mutual Aid Association	43,663	3.92	3
Total	1,113,748	100.00	90
Valid votes	1,113,748	94.53	
Invalid/blank votes	64,463	5.47	
Total votes	1,178,211	100.00	
Registered voters/turnout	1,308,727	90.03	
Source: Wahlen in Deutschland

=== Saxony ===
Party	Votes	%	Seats
Socialist Unity Party of Germany	1,616,068	49.11	59
Liberal Democratic Party of Germany	813,224	24.71	30
Christian Democratic Union	766,859	23.30	28
Peasants Mutual Aid Association	57,356	1.74	2
Cultural Association	19,148	0.58	1
Women's Committees	18,340	0.56	0
Total	3,290,995	100.00	120
Valid votes	3,290,995	93.54	
Invalid/blank votes	227,113	6.46	
Total votes	3,518,108	100.00	
Registered voters/turnout	3,803,416	92.50	
Source: Wahlen in Deutschland

=== Saxony-Anhalt ===
Party	Votes	%	Seats
Socialist Unity Party of Germany	1,063,889	45.79	51
Liberal Democratic Party of Germany	695,685	29.94	32
Christian Democratic Union	507,397	21.84	24
Peasants Mutual Aid Association	56,630	2.44	2
Total	2,323,601	100.00	109
Valid votes	2,323,601	94.15	
Invalid/blank votes	144,363	5.85	
Total votes	2,467,964	100.00	
Registered voters/turnout	2,695,416	91.56	
Source: Wahlen in Deutschland

=== Thuringia ===
Party	Votes	%	Seats
Socialist Unity Party of Germany	818,967	49.28	50
Liberal Democratic Party of Germany	472,959	28.46	28
Christian Democratic Union	314,742	18.94	19
Peasants Mutual Aid Association	55,191	3.32	3
Total	1,661,859	100.00	100
Valid votes	1,661,859	95.63	
Invalid/blank votes	75,927	4.37	
Total votes	1,737,786	100.00	
Registered voters/turnout	1,986,081	87.50	
Source: Wahlen in Deutschland

== See also ==
- States of East Germany
- 1946 Berlin state election (also held in East-Berlin)
