= Karl Mewis =

German politician (1907–1987)

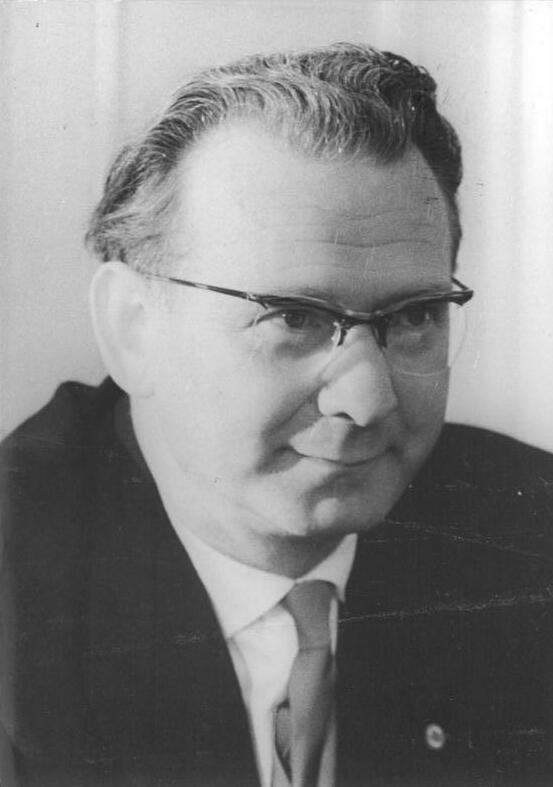
- Mewis in 1960

Chairman of the State Planning Commission
- In office 6 July 1961 – 12 January 1963
- Chairman of the Council of Ministers: Otto Grotewohl
- First Deputy: Rudolf Müller
- Preceded by: Bruno Leuschner
- Succeeded by: Erich Apel

First Secretary of the Socialist Unity Party in Bezirk Rostock
- In office 1 August 1952 – 21 July 1961
- Second Secretary: Peter Pries; Egon Rentsch; Karl Zylla; Werner Krolikowski; Günther Roloff
- Preceded by: Himself (as First Secretary of the SED in Mecklenburg)
- Succeeded by: Harry Tisch

First Secretary of the Socialist Unity Party in Mecklenburg
- In office 28 July 1951 – 1 August 1952
- Preceded by: Kurt Bürger
- Succeeded by: Himself (as First Secretary of the SED in Bezirk Rostock)
Volkskammer
Member of the Volkskammer
In office 6 February 1952 – 14 November 1963
Preceded by	Julius Meyer
Succeeded by	Multi-member district

Personal details
- Born: Karl Mewis; 22 November 1907 Hann. Münden, Province of Hanover, Kingdom of Prussia, German Empire (now Lower Saxony, Germany)
- Died: 16 June 1987 (aged 79) East Berlin, East Germany
- Party: Socialist Unity Party (1946–1987)
- Other political affiliations: Communist Party of Germany (1924–1946)
- Education: International Lenin School
- Occupation: Politician; Party Functionary; Locksmith
- Awards: Patriotic Order of Merit, 1st class; Order of Karl Marx; Star of People's Friendship
- Central institution membership: 1958–1963: Candidate member, Politburo of the Central Committee; 1952–1981: Full member, Central Committee; 1950–1952: Candidate member, Central Committee; Other offices held: 1960–1963: Member, State Council; 1949–1950: Secretary for Agitation and Propaganda, Socialist Unity Party in Mecklenburg; 1946–1949: Member, Berlin City Council; 1935–1936: Political Leader, Wasserkante (Hamburg-Schleswig-Holstein) KPD; 1934–1935: Political Leader, Middle Rhine KPD; 1929–1932: Organizational Leader, Magdeburg-Anhalt KPD

Karl Mewis (22 November 1907 – 16 June 1987) was a German resistance fighter against National Socialism, diplomat, politician and high-ranking party functionary of the Socialist Unity Party (SED).

In the German Democratic Republic, he served as the longtime First Secretary of the SED in Mecklenburg, later Bezirk Rostock and was a candidate member of the Politburo of the Central Committee of the SED. Mewis also briefly served as Chairman of the State Planning Commission before having to step down due to the supply crisis in the GDR.

== Life and career ==
=== Weimar Republic ===
Mewis completed an apprenticeship as a locksmith at the Deutsche Reichsbahn. He joined the Socialist Workers' Youth in 1922, the Communist Youth League of Germany in 1923, and the Communist Party of Germany (KPD) in 1924. From 1925 to 1928, he was the chairman of the Hessen-Waldeck branch of the Communist Youth League, and from 1929 to 1932, he was the organizational secretary of the KPD District Directorate in Magdeburg-Anhalt.

=== Nazi Germany ===
From 1932 to 1934, Mewis attended the International Lenin School in Moscow, after which he worked illegally for the KPD as the Political Leader of the Wasserkante Party District (consisting of Hamburg and Schleswig-Holstein) until 1936. He became a candidate member in 1935 and a full member in 1939 of the Central Committee of the KPD. In 1936, he emigrated to Denmark, where he led the "Northern Section" of the illegal KPD. At the end of 1936, Mewis went to France. He then succeeded Franz Dahlem in leading the International Brigades in the Spanish Civil War from 1937 to 1938. In April 1937, he worked in Barcelona as a high-ranking Comintern representative. From May 1938, he was the head of the "KPD Central Section" in Prague. After the occupation of Czechoslovakia by the Nazis, he fled via Denmark to Stockholm. There, Mewis initially led the new "KPD Central Section." In the autumn of 1939, he was summoned to Moscow. He was tasked with establishing a new leadership of the KPD in Sweden, along with Herbert Wehner and Heinrich Wiatrek, to coordinate illegal activities in the German Reich territory. This led to significant conflicts and disputes with Herbert Wehner.

After the arrests of Herbert Wehner and Heinrich Wiatrek, Mewis was also arrested on 19 August 1942. Until the summer of 1943, he was interned in Smedsbo. After his release, Mewis led the KPD leadership in Sweden. He worked closely with Richard Stahlmann during this time. During this period, Mewis increasingly distanced himself from orthodox communist views and the Soviet model of communism. He advocated for close cooperation with social democratic and bourgeois exile or resistance groups.

From autumn 1943, Mewis was a member of the "Association of German Trade Unionists" in Sweden and a leading member of the board of the Free German Cultural Association in Sweden. At the same time, he was the editor of Political Information and publications of the German Emigration Directorate.

=== Soviet occupation zone ===
At the end of 1945, Mewis returned to the Soviet Occupation Zone via Poland. Initially, he assumed the function of secretary for the KPD in Mecklenburg-Vorpommern. From March 1946 to May 1949, he was a city councilor and a member of the KPD (later SED) secretariat in Berlin.

=== Bezirk Rostock SED career ===
In 1949, Mewis joined the Mecklenburg SED as the Secretary for Agitation and Propaganda. In 1951, he became the First Secretary, succeeding Kurt Bürger, who was elected the Minister-President of Mecklenburg in July 1951. After Mecklenburg was dissolved in 1953, Mewis became the First Secretary of the SED in Bezirk Rostock, by far the most populous of the three Bezirke created from Mecklenburg.

As the First Secretary of the SED in Mecklenburg, later Bezirk Rostock, he enforced the collectivization of agriculture from 1950 to 1961. He is considered the initiator of the construction of the Rostock Overseas Port, the "Rostock Baltic Sea Weeks," and the delegation of the former SC Empor Lauter team, playing as SC Empor Rostock. Mewis frequently clashed with other socialist countries in regards to fishing.

From 1950 to 1952, he was a candidate member and from 1952 to 1981 (X. Party Congress), he was a full member of the Central Committee of the SED. From July 1958 (V. Party Congress) until his removal from this position in January 1963 (VI. Party Congress), he was a candidate member of the Politburo of the Central Committee of the SED, the de facto highest leadership body in East Germany, the Bezirk Rostock being strategically important because of its maritime border.

From 1950 to 1963, he also was a deputy of the Volkskammer, initially for the VVN. In September 1960, Mewis was elected to the State Council, the GDR's collective head of state.

=== State Planning Commission ===
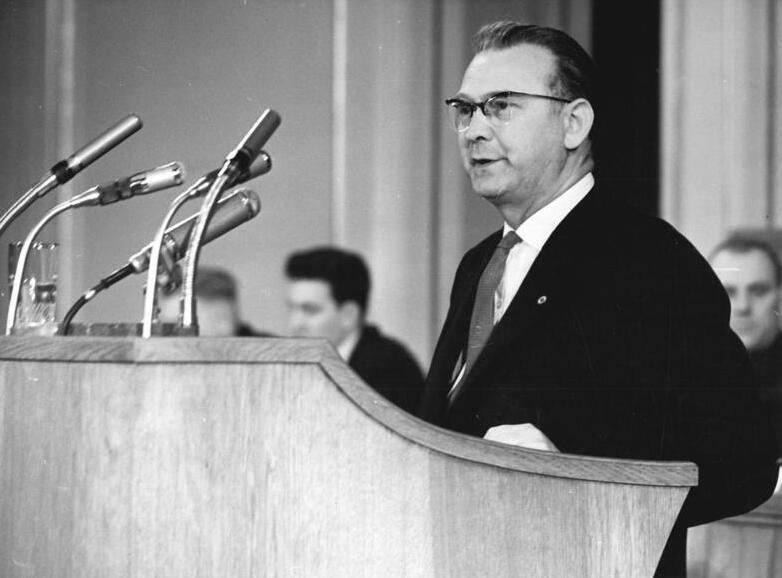
Mewis speaking before the Volkskammer in March 1962

In July 1961, the Central Committee of the SED voted to remove State Planning Commission Chairman Bruno Leuschner. Mewis was chosen as his successor.

Mewis' tenure was largely unsuccessful. He was primarily known as a loyal ideologue but had little knowledge or understanding of economics. His leadership was additionally strained by bad relationships with his colleagues in COMECON, especially the Polish, who complained about his arrogance and lack of knowledge.

In January 1963, Mewis was relieved of all his duties due to the so-called supply crisis in the GDR (1962/63) and replaced by economics expert Erich Apel. He subsequently worked to ambassador in Poland until 1968, a sinecure since the relationship between Poland and East Germany was managed by the Soviet Union. From 1969, he worked as a research fellow at the Institute for Marxism–Leninism at the Central Committee of the SED.

As part of his research for the novel "The Aesthetics of Resistance," Peter Weiss conducted a lengthy interview with Karl Mewis about his time in emigration.

On 6 May 1955, Mewis was awarded the Patriotic Order of Merit in Silver. He also received the Patriotic Order of Merit in 1960 and 1972, the Karl Marx Order in 1967, the Honorary Bar to the Patriotic Order of Merit in 1970, and the Star of People's Friendship in 1977. In 1975, he was made an honorary citizen of Rostock, a title that was revoked from him in December 1990.

== Personal life ==
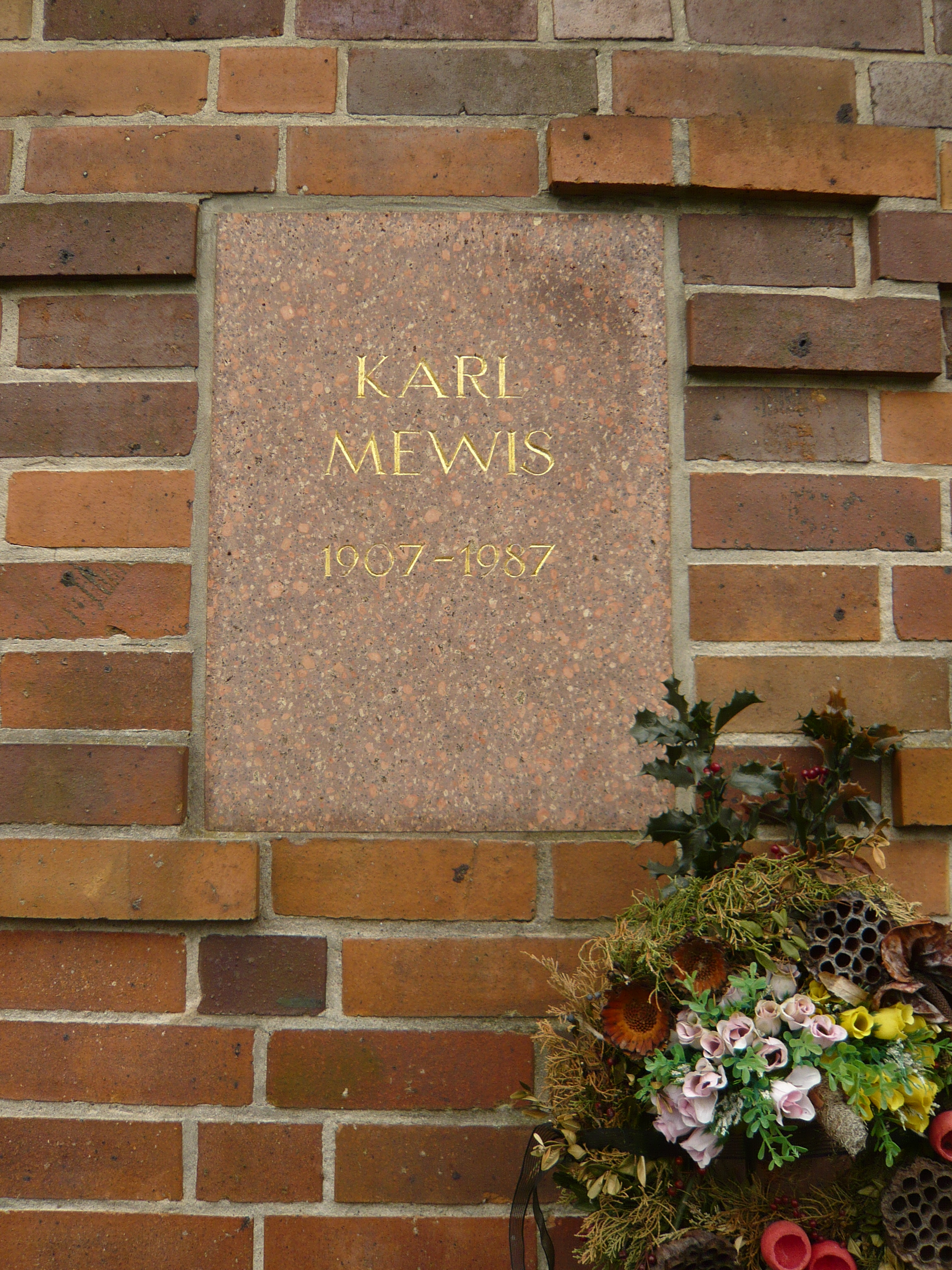
Mewis' grave in 2009

=== Family ===
He married Auguste Reichert in Kassel in 1927 (divorced in 1934). In 1939, he married Luise (known as Liesel), the daughter of the communist politician Franz Dahlem, who lived with him in Stockholm (*1919, divorced in 1953, died in 1957). When his mentor Franz Dahlem was deposed under the pretext of having relationships with Noel Field, who was denounced as an American spy, Mewis did not participate in the campaign against him, but he also did not defend him. He later separated from his daughter, who was fatally ill with cancer. Both marriages produced children, including Liesel Catherine (*1941, married Haacke, Africanist with a doctorate), Franz (longtime opera singer in Rostock), and Annette (Ph.D. in media studies).

=== Death ===
Mewis died on 16 June 1987. His urn is buried in the Memorial of the Socialists at the Friedrichsfelde Central Cemetery in Berlin-Lichtenberg.
