= State of Mecklenburg (1945–1952) =

Subdivision of the Soviet occupation zone and one of the states of East Germany

State of Mecklenburg Land Mecklenburg-Vorpommern (German)
- Subdivision of the Soviet occupation zone; State of East Germany
- 1945–1952
- Flag Coat of arms

- Mecklenburg within Allied-occupied Germany in 1947
- Capital: Rostock
- Area
  - 1946: 23,402 km^{2} (9,036 sq mi)
  - 1950: 23,402 km^{2} (9,036 sq mi)
- Population
  - 1946: 2,100,000
- Government
  - Type: Communist state under military occupation
- First Secretary of the Socialist Unity Party
  - 1946–1949: Kurt Bürger and Carl Moltmann
  - 1949–1951: Kurt Bürger
  - 1951–1952: Karl Mewis
- Minister-President
  - 1945–1951: Wilhelm Höcker
  - 1951†: Kurt Bürger
  - 1951–1952: Bernhard Quandt
- Legislature: Landtag of Mecklenburg-Vorpommern
- Historical era: Post-World War II; Cold War
  - Established: 9 July 1945
  - Declaration as state: 16 January 1947
  - State of East Germany: 7 October 1949
  - Disestablished: 25 July 1952
Preceded by
Gau Mecklenburg
Province of Pomerania
Province of Hanover
Province of Schleswig-Holstein
Succeeded by
Bezirk Neubrandenburg
Bezirk Rostock
Bezirk Schwerin
- Today part of: Germany: Brandenburg; Lower Saxony; Mecklenburg-Vorpommern

The State of Mecklenburg (German: Land Mecklenburg) was a subdivision of the Soviet occupation zone (until 1949) and one of the states of East Germany (from 1949) which corresponds widely to the present-day German state of Mecklenburg-Vorpommern. The state was originally formed as an administrative division, the State of Mecklenburg-Vorpommern (Land Mecklenburg-Vorpommern), by the Soviet Military Administration in Germany (SMAD) in July 1945. It consisted of the 1934-established Mecklenburg (a merger by the Nazi Gauleiter Friedrich Hildebrandt of the free states of Mecklenburg-Schwerin and Mecklenburg-Strelitz) and parts of the former Prussian provinces of Pommern (Western Pomerania to the Oder–Neisse line) and Hanover (Amt Neuhaus). The city of Swinemünde (now Świnoujście) was handed over to Poland in October 1945, becoming part of Szczecin Voivodeship. In November 1945, a transfer of small territories along the Inner German border to the former Province of Schleswig-Holstein was carried out as part of the Barber–Lyashchenko Agreement. About 2.1 million people were estimated to live in Mecklenburg in 1946. From 1947, the term Vorpommern was excluded from the official name as the SMAD feared that this would support revisionist actions against formerly German parts of Poland (in particular Farther Pomerania). Compared to the administrative divisions of Nazi Germany, Mecklenburg comprised the Gaue Mecklenburg and parts of Pomerania and Eastern Hanover.

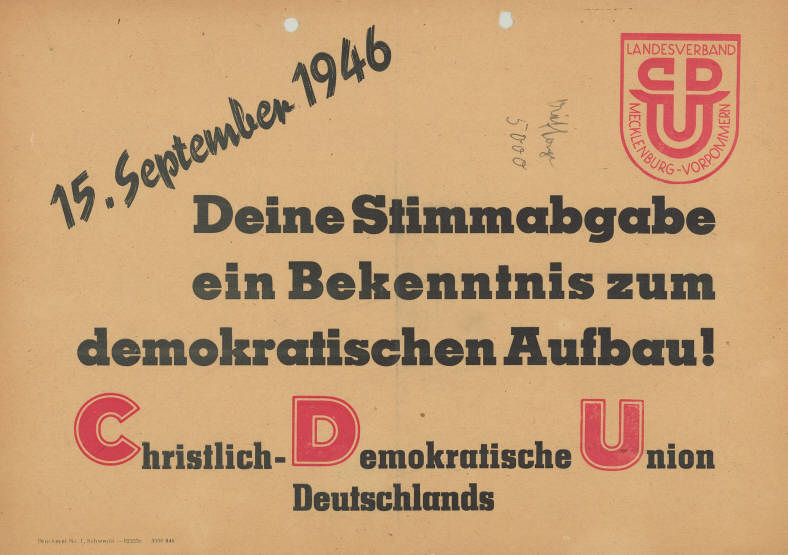

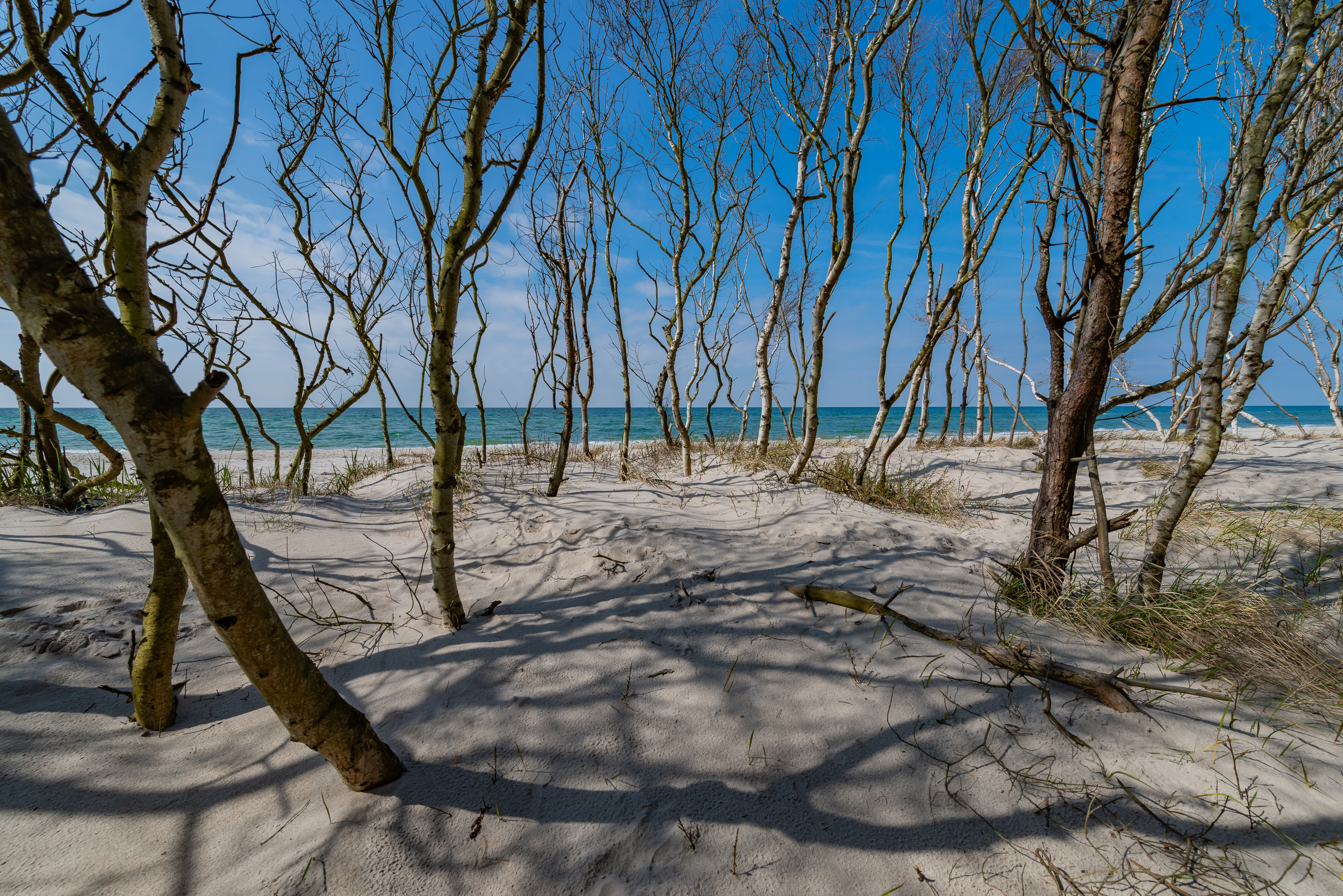
Beach with birches on Darß in the Western Pomerania Lagoon Area National Park

Due to the post-war situation in Germany, the SMAD appointed state administrations in all subdivisions of their occupation zone in July 1945. Wilhelm Höcker became the president of the state administration in Mecklenburg and was later elected minister-president. The first election for the state diet, the Landtag of Mecklenburg-Vorpommern, was held on 20 October 1946, on the same day the elections for the Landtage of the other divisions in the Soviet occupation zone were held. The Soviet-backed SED (which became the ruling party of East Germany from 1949 onwards) received 49.5% of the votes, CDU 34.1%, LDPD 12.5% and VdgB 3.9%. In February 1947, a state constitution was adopted. However, all resolutions by the parliament were made subject to approval of the SMAD.

After the foundation of the German Democratic Republic (GDR) in October 1949, a second election for the Landtag was held in October 1950. The only party was the National Front, an alliance of political parties and mass organisations controlled by the SED, which received 99.9% of the votes. Following this election, four members of the Landtag were sent to the Chamber of States (Länderkammer) of East Germany for the first and only time. As the ruling communists aimed to build a quasi-unitary state, Mecklenburg was in effect dissolved by a change of the Constitution of East Germany in July 1952. All of the five East German Länder were replaced by 14 newly formed regional districts (Bezirke). In case of Mecklenburg, the territory was transferred to the regional districts of Neubrandenburg, Rostock and Schwerin.

While Mecklenburg and the other Länder formally remained in existence, they no longer had any political or administrative function. The Chamber of States remained in existence and its members were elected in 1954 by combined sessions of the district assemblies (Bezirkstage) in each Land and in 1958 directly by the district assemblies. However, on 8 December 1958, the Chamber of States and the Länder were both formally dissolved with no objections raised. The abolition of the Chamber of States in 1958 and the ratification of two new constitutions in 1968 and 1974 respectively finally eliminated all forms of federalism in East Germany until the peaceful revolution in 1989.

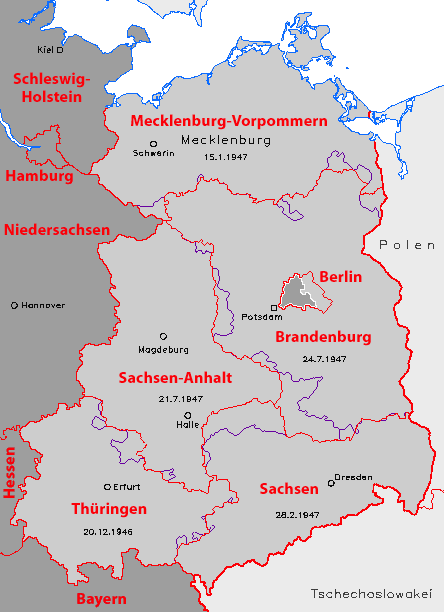
Differences between the East German Länder borders of 1947 and 1990; 1947 borders are in purple

After the first free elections in East Germany, the Ländereinführungsgesetz (State Establishment Act), adopted on 22 July 1990 by the Volkskammer, recreated the Länder in the German Democratic Republic that had been abolished in 1952. However, since changes to the boundaries of municipal districts were not reversed, and also due to considerations of expediency, these new Länder were formed by merging the Kreise of East Germany. As a result, their borders differed from the ones prior to 1952. The new Mecklenburg-Vorpommern was formed from the East German Bezirke of Neubrandenburg, Rostock and Schwerin without the Kreise of Perleberg, Prenzlau and Templin.

Originally, the Ländereinführungsgesetz was supposed to come into force on 14 October. This date was changed to 3 October, the date of German reunification, by the German reunification treaty (Einigungsvertrag). As it did not come into force before reunification, these parts of the act were immediately superseded by the corresponding articles of the Basic Law and never had any significance. On 14 October 1990, elections to the Landtage (state parliaments) were held in Mecklenburg-Vorpommern and the four other new states, initiating the formation of state governments.
