= Heinz Ziegner =

German politician (1928–2015)

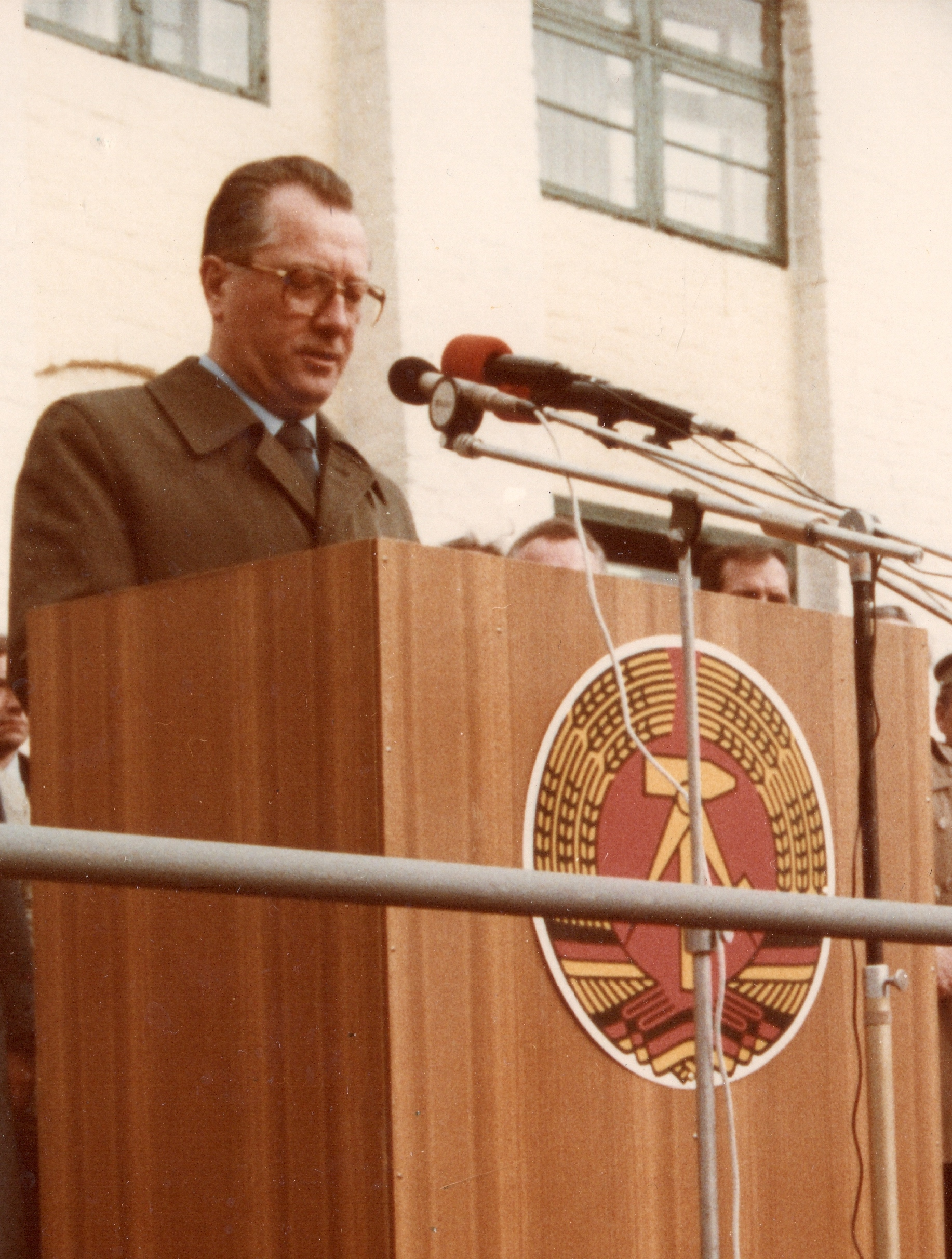
- Ziegner in 1985

First Secretary of the Socialist Unity Party in Bezirk Schwerin
- In office 28 January 1974 – 3 November 1989
- Second Secretary: Bruno Lindemann; Erich Postler
- Preceded by: Bernhard Quandt
- Succeeded by: Hans-Jürgen Audehm
Volkskammer
Member of the Volkskammer for Hagenow, Ludwigslust, Perleberg
In office 26 November 1971 – 16 November 1989
Preceded by	Bruno Kiesler
Succeeded by	Thomas Singer

Personal details
- Born: Heinz Ziegner; 13 July 1928 Annarode, Province of Saxony, Free State of Prussia, Weimar Republic (now Saxony-Anhalt, Germany)
- Died: 23 December 2015 (aged 87) Annarode, Saxony-Anhalt, Germany
- Party: Socialist Unity Party (1946–1989)
- Other political affiliations: Social Democratic Party (1945–1946)
- Education: Central Komsomol School; Agraringenieurschule Haldensleben (Dipl.-Agrar Ing.)
- Occupation: Politician; Party Functionary; Farmer
- Awards: Patriotic Order of Merit, 1st class; Banner of Labor; Order of Karl Marx; Hero of Labour
- Central institution membership: 1971–1989: Full member, Central Committee; 1967–1971: Candidate member, Central Committee; Other offices held: 1969–1974: Second Secretary, Socialist Unity Party in Bezirk Schwerin; 1960–1969: Secretary for Agriculture, Socialist Unity Party in Bezirk Magdeburg; 1954–1960: First Secretary, Free German Youth in Bezirk Magdeburg; 1954–1954: First Secretary, Socialist Unity Party in Schönebeck; 1953–1954: First Secretary, Socialist Unity Party in Salzwedel; 1952–1953: Second Secretary, Socialist Unity Party in Salzwedel

Heinz Ziegner (13 July 1928 – 23 December 2015) was a German politician and party functionary of the Socialist Unity Party (SED).

In the German Democratic Republic, he served as the longtime First Secretary of the SED in Bezirk Schwerin and was a member of the Central Committee of the SED.

== Life and career ==
=== Early career ===
He was born into a working-class family and attended middle school. After the end of World War II, the farm laborer joined the SPD (Social Democratic Party of Germany) in 1945, which was forcibly merged with the KPD (Communist Party of Germany) to form the SED in 1946.

In 1945, he became an employee of the district council in Hettstedt and served there as head of the Statistical District Office until 1949. Additionally, he became a member of the FDGB (Free German Trade Union Federation) and the FDJ (Free German Youth) in 1946. During this time, he also led the local basic organization of the SED and was a member of the FDJ leadership in Annarode until 1948.

From 1949 to 1950, he worked as a department head in the SED District Leadership in Hettstedt. In 1950, he was transferred to the district of Salzwedel, where he worked as a department head for State Administration, Economy and Agriculture. In Autumn 1951, he was made Secretary, Second Secretary in June 1952 and First Secretary in July 1953. On 1 January 1954, he assumed the same position in the district of Schönebeck.

That same year, on 17 March, he was appointed First Secretary of the Bezirk Magdeburg FDJ. As such, he also served as statutory member of the Bezirk Magdeburg SED Secretariat. Additionally, he became a member of the FDJ Central Council in 1955 and its Bureau in 1957.

From 1956 to 1957, Ziegner attended the Central Komsomol School in Moscow. He later also pursued distance learning at the Agricultural Engineering School in Haldensleben, which he completed a with a degree in agricultural sciences (Dipl.-Agrar Ing.) in 1968. He was subsequently made Secretary for Agriculture of the Bezirk Magdeburg SED until 1969.

During his Bezirk Magdeburg tenure, he was elected to the Central Committee of the SED as a candidate member in April 1967 (VII. Party Congress).

=== Bezirk Schwerin SED ===
In 1969, Ziegner was transferred to the Bezirk Schwerin SED as Second Secretary, also being elected as a full member of the Central Committee of the SED in June 1971 (VIII. Party Congress). Additionally, later in 1971, he was given a mandate by his party as a representative of the Volkskammer, nominally representing a constituency in the southwest of his Bezirk.

In January 1974, on the instigation of party leadership, he replaced Bernhard Quandt as First Secretary of the Bezirk Schwerin SED leadership, a position he held for over 15 years until 1989.

Ziegner was regarded as an uncharismatic apparatchik.

Ziegenhahn was awarded the Patriotic Order of Merit in 1960, 1969 and in Gold in 1984, the Banner of Labor in 1974, the Order of Karl Marx in 1978 and the Hero of Labour title in 1988.

=== Peaceful Revolution ===
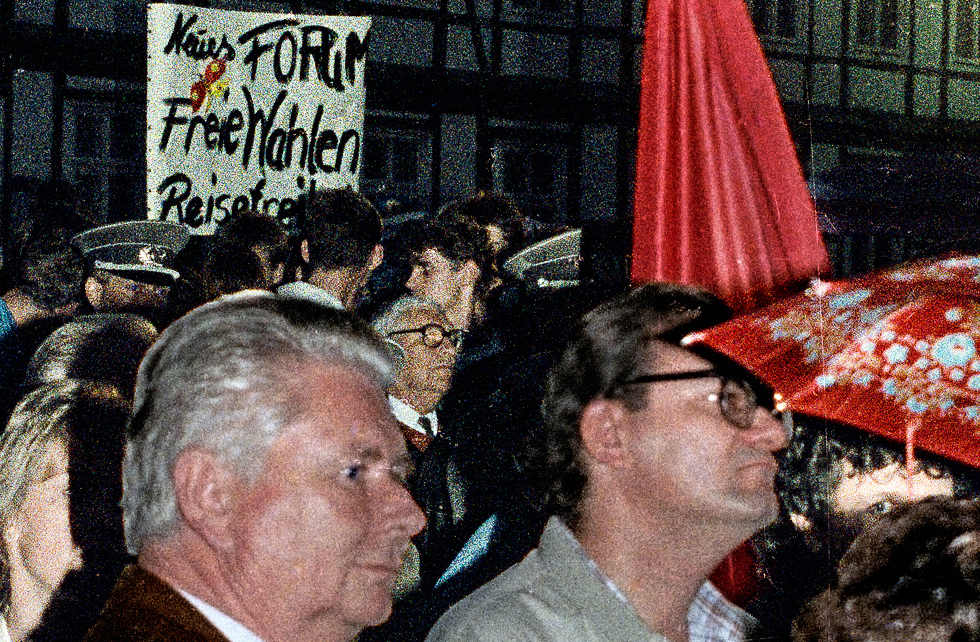
New Forum protestors at the Alten Garten in Schwerin on 23 October 1989

During the Wende, on 23 October 1989, the oppositional movement New Forum called for a demonstration after a peace prayer in the cathedral at the Alten Garten in Schwerin.

Ziegner decided to hold a counter-demonstration on the same square at the same time, which had been agreed with newly elected SED General Secretary Egon Krenz in Berlin. The SED wanted to prove that there were regions in the GDR that did not take part in the uprising. Reliable comrades were brought in as claqueurs for the staged demonstration of approval, and an National People's Army loudspeaker truck played additional applause. But since, according to the old SED method, nothing was to be left to chance, weapons were issued to officials, delivery and internment points were provided and the Combat Groups of the Working Class were mobilized. The SED put up posters advertising the demonstration as a dialogue event, but denied the Schwerin initiators of the NF the right to speak and openly threatened them during a preliminary meeting.

Only a few hours before the demonstration, the NF group decided to leave the rally if the SED speakers spoke alone, which was quickly spread by telephone and word of mouth." An unprecedented crowd of 40,000 demonstrators had gathered at the Alter Garten. When Ziegner explained to them, among other things, that the SED had "no ear and no time" for "advice aimed at eliminating socialism," the NF group marched off the square, followed by most of the assembled demonstrators. Ziegner stood there "like a wet poodle" and disappeared through a back door.

On 3 November 1989, the Bezirk Schwerin SED removed him from the position of First Secretary and installed reformer Hans-Jürgen Audehm as his successor. The SED Politburo wanted to prevent Ziegner from resigning, as many others would then have to be replaced as well. However, the majority in the Bezirk Schwerin SED Secretariat prevailed against the Politburo. He was removed by his party from the Volkskammer two weeks later, on 16 November 1989.

He was subsequently expelled from the SED in December 1989 "due to conduct damaging to the party".

Ziegner faced an arrest warrant 1990, an investigation being underway against him for breach of trust to the tune of millions of East German marks. The arrest warrant was however rescinded in April 1990.

=== Reunified Germany ===
Ziegner passed away in his hometown in 2015 at the age of 87.
