= 1950 East German state elections =

- 15 October 1950
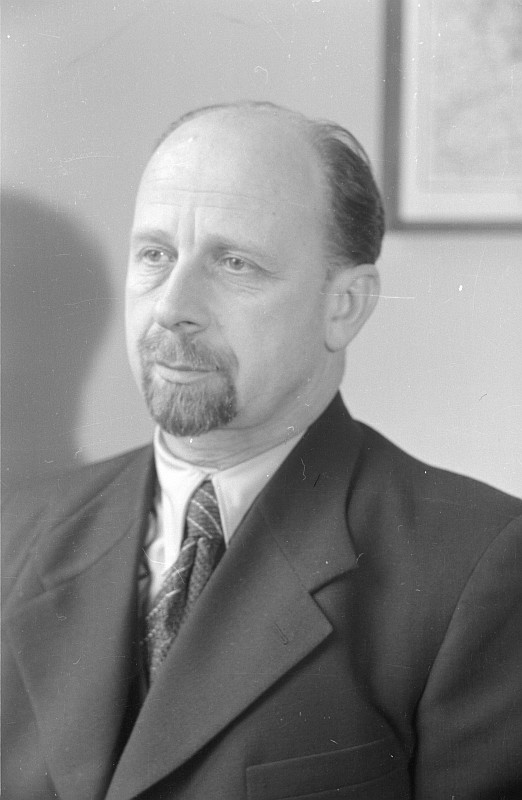
	Majority party
Leader	Walter Ulbricht
Party	SED
Alliance	National Front
Seats won	104
Seat change	▼145

State elections were held in East Germany on 15 October 1950, alongside general elections to the Volkskammer. They were the last state elections in the country, as the states were dissolved in 1952.

Voters were presented with a single list from the Socialist Unity Party of Germany-dominated National Front, which they could only approve or reject. The seat allocation in each of the state parliaments was agreed in advance between the constituent parties and mass organizations of the Front.

== Results ==
=== Summary ===
Party or alliance		Votes	%	Seats	±
National Front	Socialist Unity Party	12,096,918	99.72	104	–145
National Front	Christian Democratic Union	12,096,918	99.72	74	–59
National Front	Liberal Democratic Party	12,096,918	99.72	73	–48
National Front	Free German Trade Union Federation	12,096,918	99.72	56	New
National Front	Democratic Peasants' Party	12,096,918	99.72	36	New
National Front	National Democratic Party	12,096,918	99.72	35	New
National Front	Democratic Women's League	12,096,918	99.72	35	New
National Front	Free German Youth	12,096,918	99.72	34	New
National Front	Cultural Association	12,096,918	99.72	25	+24
National Front	Union of Persecutees of the Nazi Regime	12,096,918	99.72	20	New
National Front	Consumers' cooperatives	12,096,918	99.72	14	New
National Front	Peasants Mutual Aid Association	12,096,918	99.72	14	–1
Against		34,060	0.28	–	–
Total		12,130,978	100.00	520	+1
Valid votes		12,130,978	99.88		
Invalid/blank votes		15,037	0.12		
Total votes		12,146,015	100.00		
Registered voters/turnout		12,324,781	98.55		
Source: Elections in Germany

=== By state ===
Party	Brandenburg				Mecklenburg				Saxony				Saxony-Anhalt				Thuringia			
Party	Votes	%	Seats	+/-	Votes	%	Seats	+/-	Votes	%	Seats	+/-	Votes	%	Seats	+/-	Votes	%	Seats	+/-
SED	1,826,232	99.9	18	▼26	1,358,787	99.9	18	▼27	4,105,190	99.8	27	▼32	2,838,684	99.8	20	▼31	1,968,025	99.1	21	▼29
CDU	1,826,232	99.9	14	▼17	1,358,787	99.9	12	▼19	4,105,190	99.8	18	▼10	2,838,684	99.8	15	▼9	1,968,025	99.1	15	▼4
LDPD	1,826,232	99.9	12	▼8	1,358,787	99.9	11	0	4,105,190	99.8	17	▼13	2,838,684	99.8	18	▼14	1,968,025	99.1	15	▼13
FDGB	1,826,232	99.9	11	New	1,358,787	99.9	10	New	4,105,190	99.8	12	New	2,838,684	99.8	12	New	1,968,025	99.1	11	New
DBD	1,826,232	99.9	6	New	1,358,787	99.9	6	New	4,105,190	99.8	9	New	2,838,684	99.8	9	New	1,968,025	99.1	6	New
NDPD	1,826,232	99.9	6	New	1,358,787	99.9	5	New	4,105,190	99.8	9	New	2,838,684	99.8	9	New	1,968,025	99.1	6	New
DFD	1,826,232	99.9	9	New	1,358,787	99.9	7	New	4,105,190	99.8	7	New	2,838,684	99.8	6	New	1,968,025	99.1	6	New
FDJ	1,826,232	99.9	9	New	1,358,787	99.9	6	New	4,105,190	99.8	7	New	2,838,684	99.8	6	New	1,968,025	99.1	6	New
KB	1,826,232	99.9	5	New	1,358,787	99.9	4	New	4,105,190	99.8	5	▲4	2,838,684	99.8	6	New	1,968,025	99.1	5	New
VVN	1,826,232	99.9	4	New	1,358,787	99.9	3	New	4,105,190	99.8	5	New	2,838,684	99.8	5	New	1,968,025	99.1	3	New
Consumers' cooperatives	1,826,232	99.9	3	New	1,358,787	99.9	4	New	4,105,190	99.8	2	New	2,838,684	99.8	2	New	1,968,025	99.1	3	New
VdgB	1,826,232	99.9	3	▼2	1,358,787	99.9	4	▲1	4,105,190	99.8	2	0	2,838,684	99.8	2	0	1,968,025	99.1	3	0
Against	1,552	0.1	–	–	1,536	0.1	–	–	9,301	0.2	–	–	4,280	0.2	–	–	17,391	0.9	–	–
Invalid/blank votes	926	–	–	–	1,113	–	–	–	3,403	–	–	–	4,280	–	–	–	5,315	–	–	–
Total	1,828,710	100	100	0	1,361,241	100	90	0	4,117,894	100	120	0	2,847,244	100	110	▲1	1,990,731	100	100	0
Registered voters/turnout	1,853,850	98.6	–	–	1,372,046	99.2	–	–	4,196,647	98.1	–	–	2,874,286	99.1	–	–	2,027,952	98.2	–	–
Source: Elections in Germany																				

== Bibliography ==
- Richard Schachtner, 1956: Die deutschen Nachkriegswahlen: Wahlergebnisse in der Bundesrepublik Deutschland, in den deutschen Bundesländern, in West-Berlin, im Saarland und in der Sowjetzone (DDR) 1946–1956. Munich: Isar-Verlag. pages 77–78.
- Günter Braun, 1990: Wahlen und Abstimmungen; en: Martin Broszat y Hermann Weber: SBZ-Handbuch. Oldenburg. pages 397, 396 and 418.
- Herbert Gottwald, 1994: Der Thüringer Landtag 1946–1952. Jena: Landtag of Thuringia in association with the Wartburg Verlag. page 56.
- Kurt Adamy/Kristina Hübener, 1999: Kleine Geschichte des Brandenburger Landtages. Potsdam: Brandenburgische Landeszentrale für politische Bildung, page 169.
