= Jürgen Zelm =

German politician (born 1953)

First Secretary of the Socialist Unity Party in Bezirk Neubrandenburg
- In office 11 December 1989 – 3 March 1990
- Second Secretary: Wolfgang Schiemann
- Preceded by: Wolfgang Herrmann
- Succeeded by: Position abolished
Parliamentary constituencies
Member of the Landtag of Mecklenburg-Vorpommern
In office 26 October 1990 – 31 May 1991
Preceded by	Constituency established
Succeeded by	Lothar Meier

Personal details
- Born: Jürgen Zelm; 23 January 1953 (age 73) Anklam, Bezirk Neubrandenburg, East Germany (now Mecklenburg-Vorpommern, Germany)
- Party: Socialist Unity Party (1971–1989)
- Other political affiliations: Party of Democratic Socialism
- Education: Institut für Lehrerbildung; Akademie für Staats- und Rechtswissenschaft der DDR (Dipl.-Staatswiss.)
- Occupation: Politician; Party Functionary; Football Official
- Central institution membership: 1986–1989: Member, FDJ Central Council; Other offices held: 1984–1989: First Secretary, Bezirk Neubrandenburg FDJ; 1980–1984: Second Secretary, Bezirk Neubrandenburg FDJ

Jürgen Zelm (born 23 January 1953) is a German football official and former politician.

Zelm was a functionary of the Free German Youth (FDJ), the only legal youth movement in East Germany, in Bezirk Neubrandenburg in the 1980s. During the Peaceful Revolution, he rose to become the last First Secretary of the Bezirk Neubrandenburg Socialist Unity Party (SED). He remained politically active in the SED's successor party, the Party of Democratic Socialism (PDS) even after German reunification, becoming chair of their Mecklenburg-Vorpommern state branch and being elected to the Landtag of Mecklenburg-Vorpommern.

He left politics in May 1991, after it was revealed he had collaborated with the Stasi. Since then, he has worked as a football trainer and official for the Mecklenburg-Vorpommern State Football Association.

== Life and career ==
=== Early life ===
Zelm was born in 1953 in Anklam, which at the time was part of East Germany, to a working-class family.

After completing Polytechnic Secondary School (POS), he studied at a Institut für Lehrerbildung until 1973 to become a lower school teacher. During his studies, in 1971, he joined the ruling Socialist Unity Party (SED).

Zelm never worked as teacher, instead being made a member of the Anklam district municipal government, responsible for youth issues, physical culture and sports, after his graduation.

Between 1974 and 1979, Zelm then studied at the Academy for Political and Legal Sciences of the GDR in Potsdam, de facto a Marxist-Leninist cadre factory of the ruling SED, earning a diploma in political science (Dipl.-Staatswiss.). He thereafter became a full-time functionary of the Bezirk Neubrandenburg Free German Youth (FDJ).

He joined the Bezirk Neubrandenburg FDJ's Secretariat in 1979, being promoted to Second Secretary in 1980 and First Secretary in September 1984. As First Secretary, he also was an ex officio member of the Secretariat of the Bezirk Neubrandenburg SED. Additionally, he was a member of the FDJ Central Council from 1986 onward.

=== Peaceful Revolution ===
During the Peaceful Revolution, on 11 December 1989, Zelm was elected as First Secretary of the Bezirk Neubrandenburg SED. He succeeded Wolfgang Herrmann, who had in turn briefly succeeded deposed longtime First Secretary Johannes Chemnitzer before resigning himself alongside the entire Bezirk Neubrandenburg SED leadership.

Zelm was elected chairman of the Party of Democratic Socialism (PDS) of the reconstituted state of Mecklenburg-Vorpommern on 3 March 1990.

=== Reunified Germany ===
After German reunification, Zelm was elected to the Landtag of Mecklenburg-Vorpommern in the inaugural 1990 state election.

Zelm came under scrutiny after it was revealed that he and nine other Landtag members had collaborated with the Stasi. He resigned from the Landtag on 31 May 1991, having already stepped down as state party chairman on 4 May in favor of Helmut Holter.

Afterwards, Zelm dabbled in various jobs in the early 1990s, working as a commercial representative, insurance agent, real estate agent and opening a business for sports and leisure products. He eventually became a youth coach at the football club Post Neubrandenburg in 1994. Zelm was the DFB state coach for the women's teams in Mecklenburg-Vorpommern until June 2018 and a coordinator for the Mecklenburg-Vorpommern State Football Association.
