= Abolition of Prussia =

1947 dissolution of Prussia

The abolition of Prussia occurred on 25 February 1947 by decree of the Allied Control Council, the governing authority of post-World War II occupied Germany and Austria, through Control Council Law No. 46. The decision was grounded in the view that Prussia had long embodied the most reactionary and militaristic elements within German political life. As the engine of German militarism and a key promoter of authoritarianism and expansionist policies, Prussia was seen as fundamentally incompatible with efforts to rebuild Germany as a peaceful and democratic state. Its dominance in German affairs was deemed to have contributed directly to the wars of aggression that had devastated Europe. By dismantling Prussia, the Allies aimed to eradicate the institutional structures most responsible for German aggression.

== Historical background ==
Prussia during the German Empire (top) and the Weimar Republic (bottom)

Prussia for centuries was a major power in north-central Europe based around the cities of Berlin and Königsberg (now Kaliningrad, Russia). It rose to prominence during the eighteenth and nineteenth centuries due for the most part to the strength of its military. During the reign of the Great Elector Frederick William (r. 1640–1688), Prussia increased its military to 40,000 men and instituted an effective military administration. When his grandson Frederick William I (r. 1713–1740) undertook large-scale military reforms, he began the country's tradition of an expansive military budget, which rose to consume 80% of Prussia's entire annual budget. By the time of his death in 1740, the Prussian Army had grown to a standing force of 83,000 men. In the War of the Austrian Succession (1740–1748) and the Seven Years' War (1759–1763), his son Frederick the Great (r. 1740–1786) won Silesia from the Austrian Empire and raised the Kingdom of Prussia to the level of a great European power. By that time, the large Prussian landowners known as Junkers had a virtual monopoly on the Kingdom's officer corps, a position that they would for the most part maintain throughout the remainder of Prussia's existence.

Defeats at the hands of Napoleon's armies in the battles of Jena and Auerstedt in 1806 impelled Prussia to modernize its army's tactics and weaponry. The improvements helped Prussia to victories over Denmark in the 1864 Second Schleswig War, Austria in the Austro-Prussian War of 1866, and France in the Franco-Prussian War of 1870–1871. The wars culminated in the unification of Germany under Prussia's leadership and the exclusion of Austria from the new German Empire. Prussia was at the core of the Imperial German Army, especially its officers, and Prussian militarism became part of German nationalism. Under Otto von Bismarck, who was chancellor of the Empire from 1871 to 1890, the military imperatives of punctuality, orderliness and discipline became civilian virtues as well.

Following Germany's defeat in the First World War, the new Free State of Prussia bore most of Germany's territorial losses but remained the dominant state of the Weimar Republic, accounting for about three-fifths of both its land area and population. It has been called the Weimar Republic's "bulwark of democracy" because of its stable governments, which were mostly socialist-led. Shortly before Adolf Hitler came to power, the national government, headed by conservatives Paul von Hindenburg and Franz von Papen, ousted the Prussian state government in the 1932 Prussian coup d'état.

Historian Gordon A. Craig has argued that the Allies' view of Prussia's militarism was historically one-sided. He noted that given the political situation in Europe in the seventeenth and eighteenth centuries, "military power was the condition of Brandenburg-Prussia's survival". In addition, many aspects of Prussia were progressive for their time. The Great Elector (1640–1688) welcomed a large number of Huguenots into Prussia who had fled religious persecution in France, Frederick I founded the Prussian Academy of Sciences, and Frederick the Great, a strong proponent of the Enlightenment, enacted the General State Laws for the Prussian States, a system of law that guaranteed certain rights to all Prussians. He also made Prussia one of the first countries in the world to introduce generally compulsory primary education. Prussia's era of liberalism, however, largely ended with the reactionary post-Napoleonic period that began in 1819.

== Control Council Law No. 46 ==
Prussia was officially abolished by Control Council Law No. 46, passed by the Allied occupation authorities on 25 February 1947. Article 1 dissolved the State of Prussia, its government and subordinate authorities, and Article 2 stipulated that those parts of Prussia which were "subject to the supreme authority of the Control Council" were to be granted the legal status of states (Länder) or incorporated into existing states. Per Article 3, the functions, assets and liabilities of Prussia were to be transferred to those states, subject to agreements concluded by the Allied Control Authority.

The Yalta Conference of February 1945 and the Potsdam Conference of July and August 1945, where the leaders of the United Kingdom, the United States and the Soviet Union discussed post-war Germany, had prepared the way for Prussia's abolition. At Yalta, the three leaders agreed to disarm Germany and eradicate German militarism. To compensate Poland for the loss of its eastern territory to the Soviet Union (at the Curzon Line), Poland would take over land from Germany, which would naturally come from Prussia as Germany's easternmost state. At Potsdam, Germany's eastern border was set at the Oder–Neisse line, confirming the loss of a large portion of Prussia, including East Prussia and all but a very small portion of Silesia. German residents of the ceded territories were to be expelled west of the line. By the time Control Council Law No. 46 was issued two years later, the eastern regions of Prussia were already part of Poland or the Soviet Union and millions of Prussian Germans had been forced to the west.

== Territories today ==
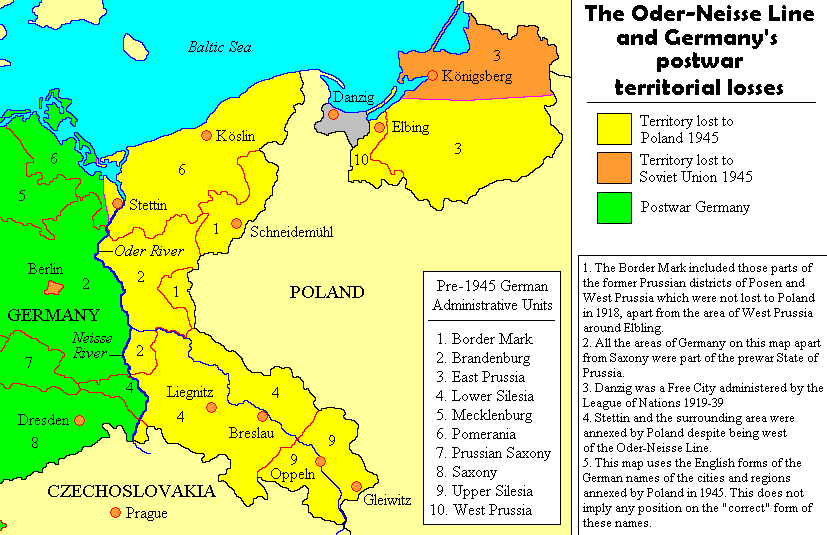
Eastern territory lost by Germany at the end of World War II

The territories of Prussia as of 1937 (mainly its twelve provinces) became the following entities after the Second World War:

- City of Berlin: split in 1948 into West Berlin and East Berlin, reunified in 1990 to form the State of Berlin.
- Brandenburg: territories east of the rivers Oder and Neisse became part of Poland in 1945. The rest was a state of East Germany between 1947 and 1952, at which point it was dissolved under an East German administrative reform. Since reunification in 1990, the state of Brandenburg exists again.
- East Prussia: split into Poland's Warmian–Masurian Voivodeship and Russia's Kaliningrad Oblast.
- Hanover: merged in 1946 with the states of Brunswick, Oldenburg and Schaumburg-Lippe to form the state of Lower Saxony.
- Hesse-Nassau: the majority of the province was merged with the People's State of Hesse to form the state of Hesse. Some western parts, forming the modern day Westerwaldkreis and Rhein-Lahn-Kreis, were merged with the Rhine Province and Bavarian Palatinate to form the state of Rhineland-Palatinate.
- Hohenzollern: merged with the southern parts of Württemberg to form the state of Württemberg-Hohenzollern in 1945. In 1952 Württemberg-Hohenzollern merged with South Baden and Württemberg-Baden to form the state of Baden-Württemberg.
- Lower Silesia: the majority of the province is now part of Poland, mostly within the Lower Silesian Voivodeship. Some small parts west of the Oder-Neisse line around Görlitz are part of the state of Saxony.
- Pomerania: split by the Oder-Neisse line between Poland and Germany. The Polish part is now part of the Pomeranian and West Pomeranian Voivodeships, while the German part merged with Mecklenburg to form the East German state of Mecklenburg, which was abolished in 1952 and recreated as Mecklenburg-Western Pomerania in 1990 during German reunification.
- Posen-West Prussia: today part of Poland, mainly as part of the Greater Poland Voivodeship.
- Rhineland: split in two in 1946. The northern part merged with the Province of Westphalia and the Free State of Lippe to form the state of North Rhine-Westphalia, while the southern part merged with the Oldenburg exclave of Birkenfeld, the Rhenish Hesse part of the People's State of Hesse and Bavarian Palatinate to form the state of Rhineland-Palatinate.
- Saxony: The two regions around Magdeburg and Halle (Saale) merged with the Free State of Anhalt to form the East German state of Saxony-Anhalt, which was abolished in the 1952 administrative reform and then recreated in 1990 during German reunification. The region around Erfurt merged with the Weimar State of Thuringia to form the East German state of Thuringia, which was also abolished in 1952 and recreated in 1990.
- Schleswig-Holstein: became the state of Schleswig-Holstein.
- Upper Silesia: part of Poland, mainly as the Opole Voivodeship.
- Westphalia: merged with the northern part of the Rhine Province and the Free State of Lippe to form the state of North Rhine-Westphalia.

== Later history ==
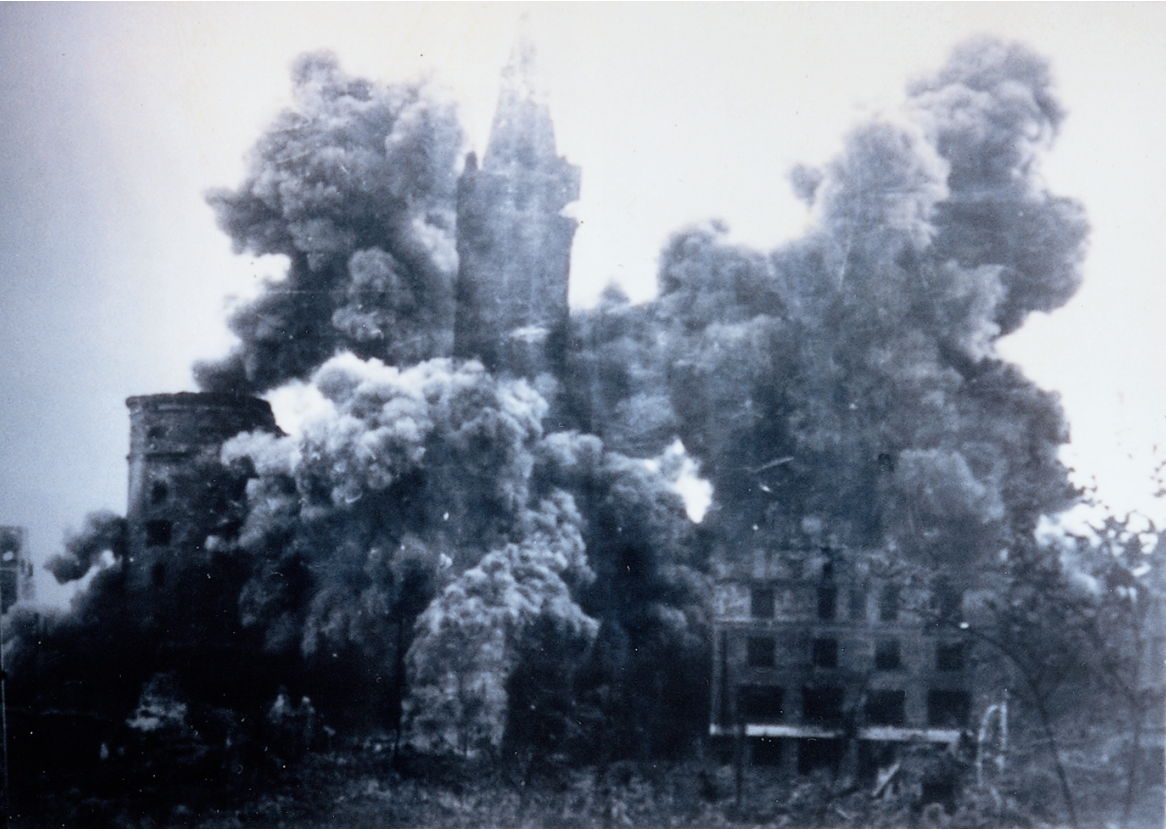
Demolition of the war-damaged Königsberg Castle by the Soviets in 1959

Christopher Clark wrote in Iron Kingdom: the Rise and Downfall of Prussia, 1600–1947 that the anti-Prussian viewpoint that had arisen after World War I led to a readiness to tie Nazism to Prussianism and a desire to erase not just the name "Prussia" but also its culture. The Allied World War II leaders were in agreement that the "moribund corpse of Prussia" had to be finally laid to rest in all its forms. The great East Elbian Junker estates, some with important cultural content, were plundered and burned by the Soviets. Potsdam, a city of little strategic value but important in the history of Brandenburg-Prussia, was the object of a massive bombing raid just a few weeks before the end of the war. In 1954, almost ten years after the war ended, the statues of Hohenzollern kings that had lined Berlin's Siegesallee were secretly buried by the Soviets. Königsberg, the capital of the region that was Prussia's original homeland, was all but levelled not only during but after the long Russian siege. It received a Russian name (Kaliningrad), as did all the other cities and towns in the northern half of East Prussia after it was taken over by the Soviets and resettled with Russian citizens. An estimated 10 million Prussians were expelled from their homes and dispersed across what would become the two new nations of East and West Germany.

Prussia's reconstitution was opposed by powerful German postwar politicians, notably the first West German Chancellor, Konrad Adenauer.

The German Democratic Republic (East Germany) suspended the law by a decision of the Council of Ministers of the Soviet Union when the Soviet Control Commission in East Germany was dissolved on 20 September 1955.

Prussia's abolition resulted in the Prussian Academy of Arts dropping "Prussian" from its name in 1945 before finally being disbanded in 1955. The Prussian Academy of Sciences was renamed in 1972. It was abolished and replaced by the Berlin-Brandenburg Academy of Sciences and Humanities in 1992 as part of the process of German reunification. In 2007, a general "cleansing" of occupation laws de facto swept away Law No. 46, although without making direct reference to it or to Prussia.

== Text of Law 46 ==
Control Council Law No. 46:

The Prussian State which from early days has been a bearer of militarism and reaction in Germany has de facto ceased to exist.
Guided by the interests of preservation of peace and security of peoples and with the desire to assure further reconstruction of the political life of Germany on a democratic basis, the Control Council enacts as follows:

Article I
The Prussian State together with its central government and all its agencies are abolished.
Article II
Territories which were a part of the Prussian State and which are at present under the supreme authority of the Control Council will receive the status of Länder (states) or will be absorbed into Länder.
The provisions of this Article are subject to such revision and other provisions as may be agreed upon by the Control Council, or as may be laid down in the future Constitution of Germany. (Note: eventually the Basic Law for West and reunified Germany, as well as the Constitution of East Germany)
Article III
The State and administrative functions as well as the assets and liabilities of the former Prussian State will be transferred to appropriate Länder, subject to such agreements as may be necessary and made by the Allied Control Council.
Article IV
This law becomes effective on the day of its signature.

Signed in Berlin on February 25, 1947.

- Marie-Pierre Kœnig, Army general
- Vasily Sokolovsky, Marshal of the Soviet Union
- Lucius D. Clay, General for Joseph T. McNarney, General
- Brian Robertson, for Sir Sholto Douglas, Marshal of the Royal Air Force

== See also ==
- Legal status of Germany
- Reconstruction of Germany
