= State of Brandenburg (1947–1952) =

Subdivision of the Soviet occupation zone and one of the states of Soviet East Germany

State of Brandenburg Land Mark Brandenburg (1947) Provinz Mark Brandenburg (1945–1947)
- Subdivision of the Soviet occupation zone; State of East Germany
- 1945–1952
- Flag Coat of arms

- Brandenburg within Allied-occupied Germany in 1947
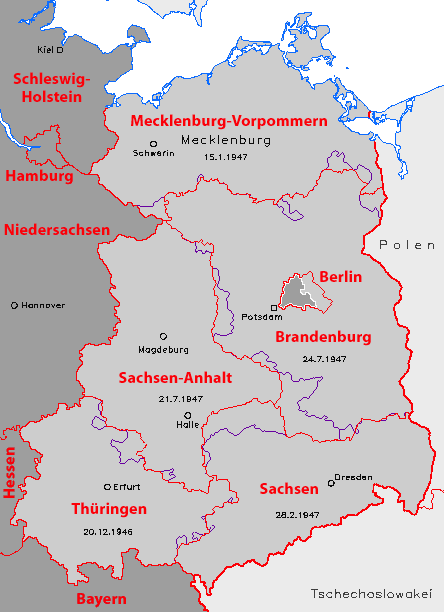
- Comparison of the country borders of 1947 (violet) and 1990 (red); since 1990 the State of Berlin covers the Greater Berlin area.
- Capital: Potsdam
- Area
  - 1950: 27,612 km^{2} (10,661 sq mi)
- Population
  - 1950: 2,725,000
- Government
  - Type: Communist state under military occupation
- First Secretary of the Socialist Unity Party
  - 1946–1948: Willy Sägebrecht and Friedrich Ebert Jr.
  - 1948–1949: Willy Sägebrecht and Paul Bismarck
  - 1949–1952: Willy Sägebrecht
- Minister-President
  - 1945–1949: Karl Steinhoff
  - 1949–1952: Rudolf Jahn
- Legislature: Landtag of Brandenburg
- Historical era: Post-World War II; Cold War
  - Established: 9 July 1945
  - Declaration as state: 6 February 1947
  - Abolition of Prussia: 25 February 1947
  - State of East Germany: 7 October 1949
  - Disestablished: 25 July 1952
Preceded by
Province of Brandenburg
Berlin
Succeeded by
Bezirk Cottbus
Bezirk Frankfurt
Bezirk Neubrandenburg
Bezirk Potsdam
Bezirk Schwerin
- Today part of: Germany: Berlin; Brandenburg; Mecklenburg-Vorpommern; Saxony; Saxony-Anhalt

The State of Brandenburg (German: Land Brandenburg) was a subdivision of the Soviet occupation zone (until 1949) and state of East Germany (from 1949) which corresponds widely to the present-day German state Brandenburg. The state was originally formed as administrative division Province of March Brandenburg (Provinz Mark Brandenburg) by the Soviet Military Administration in Germany (SMAD) in July 1945, a re-establishment of the Prussian Province of Brandenburg, excluding the Eastern parts behind the Oder–Neisse line to Poland. With the abolition of Prussia in February 1947, it was named State of March Brandenburg (Land Mark Brandenburg) but in June 1947 the SMAD forced to change the name to State of Brandenburg. In August 1945, a transfer of territory was ruled out between Allied-occupied Berlin. Compared to the administrative divisions of Nazi Germany, it comprised the Western part of the Gau March Brandenburg and small parts of Berlin.

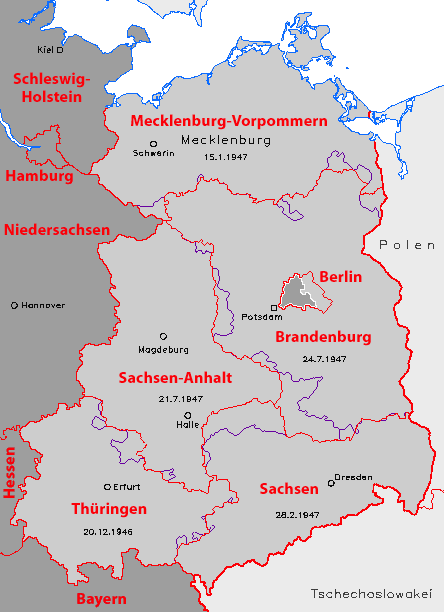
Differences of borders between 1947 (purple) and 1990 (red)

Due to the post-war situation in Germany, the SMAD appointed state administrations in all subdivisions of their occupation zone in July 1945. Karl Steinhoff became the president of the state administration in Brandenburg and later was elected to the Minister-President. The first election for the Landtag of Brandenburg was held on 20 October 1946, on the same day the elections for the Landtage of the other divisions in the SBZ had been ruled out. The Soviet-backed SED (which became the ruling party of the GDR from 1949 onwards) received 43.5% of the votes, CDU 30.3%, LDPD 20.5% and VdgB 5.7%. In February 1947, the state-constitution was adopted. However, all resolutions by the parliament were made subject to approval of the SMAD.

After the foundation of the German Democratic Republic (GDR) in October 1949, a second election for the Landtag was held in October 1950. The only party was the National Front, an alliance of political parties and mass organisations controlled by the SED, which received 99.9% of the votes. Following this election, it became the first and only time that five members of the Landtag were sent to the Chamber of States of the GDR. As the ruling communists aimed to build a quasi-unitary state, the state was dissolved by a change of the Constitution of East Germany in July 1952. All of the five Länder were replaced by 14 newly formed Bezirke. In case of Brandenburg, the territory was transferred to the Bezirke Cottbus, Frankfurt, Neubrandenburg, Potsdam and Schwerin. The abolishment of the Chamber of States in 1958 and two ratifications of the constitution in 1968 and 1974 finally eliminate all kinds of federalism in the GDR until the peaceful revolution in 1989. After the first free elections in the GDR, the five Länder were re-established with some smaller geographical adjustments in August 1990 to accede to the Federal Republic of Germany.

== Minister President (1945–1952) ==
Portrait	Name (Born–Died)	Term of office			Political party
Portrait	Name (Born–Died)	Took office	Left office	Days	Political party
1	Karl Steinhoff (1892–1981)	20 December 1946	5 December 1949	1081	Social Democratic Party (until 1946); Socialist Unity Party (from 1946)
2	Rudolf Jahn (1906–1990)	5 December 1949	23 July 1952	961	Socialist Unity Party
From 23 July 1952 until 3 October 1990, State of Brandenburg was abolished.
