= Bezirk Cottbus =

District of East Germany

District of Cottbus Bezirk Cottbus
- District (Bezirk) of East Germany
- 1952–1990
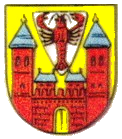
- Coat of arms

- Location of Bezirk Cottbus within the German Democratic Republic
- Capital: Cottbus
- Area
  - 1989: 8,262 km^{2} (3,190 sq mi)
- Population
  - 1989: 884,700
- Government
- SED First Secretary
  - 1952–1953: Franz Bruk
  - 1953–1969: Albert Stief
  - 1969–1989: Werner Walde
  - 1989–1990: Wolfgang Thiel
- Chairman of the Council of the Bezirk
  - 1952–1959: Werner Manneberg
  - 1959–1962: Heinz Krüger
  - 1962: Rudolf Müller (acting)
  - 1962–1971: Hans Schmidt
  - 1971–1989: Irma Uschkamp
  - 1989–1990: Peter Siegesmund
  - 1990: Karl-Heinz Kretschmer (as Regierungsbevollmächtigter)
- History
  - Established: 1952
  - Disestablished: 1990
Preceded by
Brandenburg (1945-1952)
Saxony-Anhalt (1945–1952)
Saxony (1945–1952)
Succeeded by
Brandenburg
Saxony-Anhalt
Saxony
- Today part of: Germany

Bezirk Cottbus was a district (Bezirk) of the German Democratic Republic (East Germany). The administrative seat and main town was Cottbus.

== History ==
The district was established, along with the other 13, on 25 July 1952, de facto replacing the East German States (Länder) which had been established in the post-war period; these in turn had replaced the Nazi Gaue (and the pre-war States and Prussian Provinces which had been de facto but not de jure superseded by the Gaue). Most of Bezirk Cottbus had been part of Brandenburg, with smaller parts taken from Saxony and Saxony-Anhalt

On 3 October 1990 the Bezirke were disestablished due to the reunification of Germany. Most of the Kreise of Bezirk Cottbus returned to the reconstituted states which they had belonged to before 1952: most went to Brandenburg, while the districts of Hoyerswerda and Weißwasser returned to Saxony and Jessen returned to Saxony-Anhalt; Bad Liebenwerda and Herzberg, which had been part of Saxony-Anhalt before 1952 became part of Brandenburg.

== Geography ==
=== Position ===
Bezirk Cottbus, mainly located in Brandenburg and partly in Saxony (Hoyerswerda), bordered the Bezirke of Frankfurt, Potsdam, Halle, Leipzig and Dresden. It also bordered Poland.

=== Subdivision ===
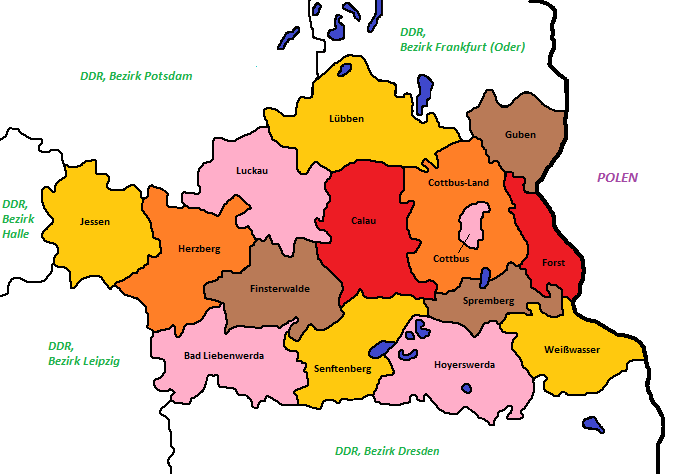
The Kreise of Bezirk Cottbus c. 1957

The Bezirk was divided into 15 Kreise: 1 urban district (Stadtkreis) and 14 rural districts (Landkreise):

- Urban district: Cottbus.
- Rural districts: Bad Liebenwerda; Calau; Cottbus-Land; Finsterwalde; Forst; Guben; Herzberg; Hoyerswerda; Jessen; Luckau; Lübben; Senftenberg; Spremberg; Weißwasser.
