= Bezirk Neubrandenburg =

District of East Germany

District of Neubrandenburg Bezirk Neubrandenburg
- District (Bezirk) of East Germany
- 1952–1990
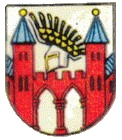
- Coat of arms

- Location of Bezirk Neubrandenburg within the German Democratic Republic
- Capital: Neubrandenburg
- Area
  - 1989: 10,948 km^{2} (4,227 sq mi)
- Population
  - 1989: 620,500
- Government
- SED First Secretary
  - 1952–1953: Willi Wiebershausen
  - 1953–1960: Max Steffen
  - 1960–1963: Georg Ewald
  - 1963–1989: Johannes Chemnitzer
  - 1989: Wolfgang Herrmann
  - 1989–1990: Jürgen Zelm
- Chairman of the Council of the Bezirk
  - 1952–1953: Wilhelm Steudte
  - 1953–1957: Hans Jendretzky
  - 1957–1959: Horst Brasch
  - 1959–1962: Kurt Guter
  - 1962–1967: Lothar Geissler
  - 1967–1972: Adolf Garling
  - 1972–1977: Gottfried Sperling
  - 1977–1990: Heinz Simkowski
  - 1990: Wolfgang Otto (acting)
  - 1990: Martin Brick (as Regierungsbevollmächtigter)
- History
  - Established: 1952
  - Disestablished: 1990
Preceded by	Succeeded by
Mecklenburg (1945–1952); Brandenburg (1945–1952)	Mecklenburg-Vorpommern; Brandenburg
- Today part of: Germany

The Bezirk Neubrandenburg was a district (Bezirk) of East Germany. The administrative seat and the main town was Neubrandenburg.

== History ==
The district was established, with the other 13, on 25 July 1952, substituting the old German states. After 3 October 1990, it was disestablished following German reunification, becoming again mostly part of the state of Mecklenburg-Vorpommern. The rural districts of Prenzlau and Templin (on 3 October 1990), municipalities of Nechlin, Wollschow, Woddow, Bagemühl and Grünberg with city of Brüssow in Pasewalk district and municipalities of Fahrenholz, Güterberg, Jagow, Lemmersdorf, Lübbenow, Milow, Trebenow, Wilsickow, Wismar (Uckerland) and Wolfshagen in Strasburg one part of the one of Brandenburg on 9 May 1992.

== Geography ==
=== Position ===
The Bezirk Neubrandenburg bordered with the Bezirke of Rostock, Schwerin, Potsdam and Frankfurt (Oder). It bordered also with Poland and a little part of it was located by the Stettin Bay, a lagoon separated from the Baltic Sea.

=== Subdivision ===
The Bezirk Neubrandenburg was divided into 15 further, smaller districts (Kreise): 1 urban district (Stadtkreis) and 14 rural districts (Landkreise):

- Urban districts : Neubrandenburg.
- Rural districts : Altentreptow; Anklam; Demmin; Malchin; Neubrandenburg-Land; Neustrelitz; Pasewalk; Prenzlau; Röbel/Müritz; Strasburg; Templin; Teterow; Ueckermünde; Waren.
