= Kurt Bürger =

German communist politician

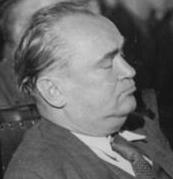
Kurt Bürger in 1949

Kurt Bürger (Karl Wilhelm Ganz; 27 August 1894 – 28 July 1951) was a German politician.

Bürger was born in Karlsruhe, Baden. From 1912 to 1918, he was a representative of the Social Democratic Party. In 1919, he was a cofounder of the Communist Party of Germany.

After World War II, he became a member of the East German Socialist Unity Party and served as minister-president of the East German State of Mecklenburg in 1951.

On 28 July 1951, Bürger died in Schwerin.

== See also ==
- List of Social Democratic Party of Germany politicians
- List of German Communist Party members
