= Bezirk Magdeburg =

District of East Germany

District of Magdeburg Bezirk Magdeburg
- District (Bezirk) of East Germany
- 1952–1990
- Flag Coat of arms

- Location of Bezirk Magdeburg within the German Democratic Republic
- Capital: Magdeburg
- Area
  - 1989: 11,526 km^{2} (4,450 sq mi)
- Population
  - 1989: 1,249,500
- Government
- SED First Secretary
  - 1952–1979: Alois Pisnik
  - 1979–1983: Kurt Tiedke
  - 1983–1989: Werner Eberlein
  - 1989: Wolfgang Pohl
  - 1989–1990: Manfred Dunkel
- Chairman of the Council of the Bezirk
  - 1952–1953: Josef Hegen
  - 1953–1956: Paul Hentschel
  - 1956–1957: Bruno Kiesler (acting)
  - 1957–1959: Paul Hentschel
  - 1960–1985: Kurt Ranke
  - 1985–1990: Siegfried Grünwald
  - 1990: Wolfgang Braun (as Regierungsbevollmächtigter)
- History
  - Established: 1952
  - Disestablished: 1990
Preceded by	Succeeded by
Saxony-Anhalt (1945–1952)	Saxony-Anhalt; Brandenburg
- Today part of: Germany

The Bezirk Magdeburg was a district (Bezirk) of East Germany. The administrative seat and the main town was Magdeburg.

== History ==
The district was established, with the other 13, on 25 July 1952, substituting the old German states. After 3 October 1990 it was abolished as part of the process of German reunification, becoming again part of the state of Saxony-Anhalt except Havelberg district, passed to Brandenburg.

== Geography ==
=== Position ===
The Bezirk Magdeburg bordered with the Bezirke of Schwerin, Potsdam, Halle and Erfurt. It also bordered with West Germany.

=== Subdivision ===
The Bezirk was divided into 22 Kreise: 1 urban district (Stadtkreis) and 21 rural districts (Landkreise):

- Urban district : Magdeburg.
- Rural districts : Burg; Gardelegen; Genthin; Halberstadt; Haldensleben; Havelberg; Kalbe; Klötze; Loburg; Oschersleben; Osterburg; Salzwedel; Schönebeck; Seehausen; Staßfurt; Stendal; Tangerhütte; Wanzleben; Wernigerode; Wolmirstedt; Zerbst.

== See also ==
- Regierungsbezirk Magdeburg
