= Administrative divisions of East Germany =

The administrative divisions of the German Democratic Republic (commonly referred to as East Germany) were constituted in two different forms during the country's history. The GDR first retained the traditional German division into federated states called Länder, but in 1952 they were replaced with districts called Bezirke. Immediately before German reunification in 1990, the Länder were restored, but they were not effectively reconstituted until after reunification had completed.

== Division into Länder ==
=== General background ===
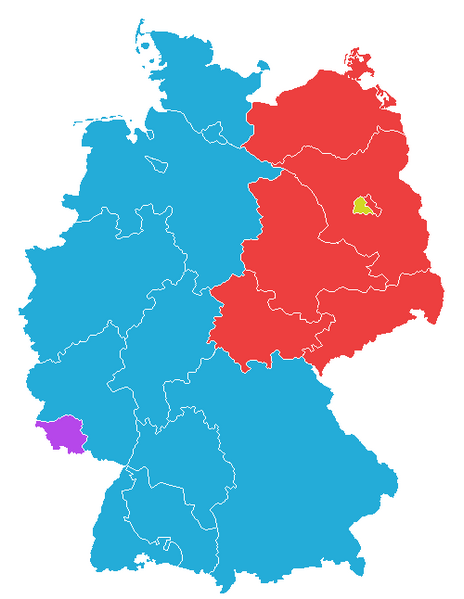
The GDR (in red) with its original Länder.

In May 1945, following its defeat in World War II, Germany was occupied by the United States, Britain, France and the Soviet Union. All four occupation powers reorganised the territories by recreating the Länder (states), the constituting parts of federal Germany. The state of Prussia, whose provinces extended to all four zones and covered two thirds of Germany, was abolished in 1947.

Special conditions were assigned to Berlin, which the four powers divided into four sectors. A united German state government existed in the city until it broke apart in 1948. After 1949, both West Berlin and East Berlin (officially only called Berlin) were in effect incorporated into the Federal Republic of Germany and the German Democratic Republic, respectively, despite not legally being part of these countries.

=== Länder in East Germany ===
In the Soviet occupation zone, five Länder were established which roughly corresponded to the preexisting states and provinces. (The territories east of the Oder–Neisse line had been transferred from the Soviet occupation zone to the Polish authorities as agreed upon at the Potsdam Conference.) The five states were:

- Brandenburg was created out of the major part of the Prussian province of that name
- Mecklenburg-Vorpommern was created out of the state of Mecklenburg (reunited out of Mecklenburg-Schwerin and Mecklenburg-Strelitz only in 1934) and the Western parts of the Prussian province of Pomerania
- Saxony (Sachsen) was augmented by the westernmost parts of the Prussian province of Lower Silesia. Also, the town of Reichenau was ceded to Poland.
- Saxony-Anhalt (Sachsen-Anhalt) was created out of most of the Prussian Province of Saxony and the Free State of Anhalt
- Thuringia (Thüringen) was augmented by neighbouring parts from the Prussian provinces of Saxony and Hesse-Nassau.

In 1949, the Soviet occupation zone was transformed into the German Democratic Republic. The five Länder (and East Berlin, though the latter only with consultative votes) participated in the legislative branch through the Länderkammer ('Chamber of States'), which was elected by the Landtage (state parliaments). However, the Länder were not constituting entities forming a federal republic (as in West Germany) but rather decentralised administrative entities of a quasi-unitary state.

As a nod to the legal fiction that East Berlin was still occupied territory, it was counted neither as part of Brandenburg, nor as a state in its own right. East Germany claimed Berlin as its capital, a status recognised by virtually all Eastern Bloc countries, and exercised de facto control over East Berlin. However, the Western Allies (the US, UK, and France) never formally acknowledged the authority of the East German government to govern East Berlin; the official Allied protocol recognised only the authority of the Soviet Union in East Berlin in accordance with the occupation status of Berlin as a whole.

== Division into Bezirke ==
Bezirke of the GDR (1952–1990).

On 23 July 1952, a law combined the GDR's municipal districts (Kreise) into 14 regional districts (Bezirke), and subsequently, on 25 July 1952, the state governments transferred their administrative tasks to the new regional districts.

With this law, the Länder were in effect dissolved, and the GDR had become a highly centralized state. While they formally remained in existence, they no longer had any political or administrative functions. The Bezirke were drawn without regard to the borders of the Länder and each named after their capitals, from north to south: Rostock, Neubrandenburg, Schwerin, Potsdam, Frankfurt (Oder), Magdeburg, Cottbus, Halle, Leipzig, Erfurt, Dresden, Karl-Marx-Stadt (named Chemnitz until 1953), Gera and Suhl.

The Länderkammer also remained in existence and its members were elected in 1954 by combined sessions of the Bezirkstage (district assemblies) in each Land and in 1958 directly by the Bezirkstage. However, on 8 December 1958, the Länderkammer formally dissolved itself with no objections being raised. The Länder continued to exist de jure up until the entry into force of the 1968 Constitution, which formalized their abolition.

Due to its special status, East Berlin was originally not counted as a Bezirk. In 1961, after the construction of the Berlin Wall, East Berlin came to be recognised in GDR administration as a 15th district, though it retained a special status until the adoption of the 1968 Constitution formally designated it as Bezirk Berlin.

The Bezirke (with the exception of East Berlin, which consisted of a single municipality) were subdivided into rural districts (Landkreise) and urban districts (Stadtkreise):

Bezirk	Subdivisions	Corresponding state according to the Ländereinführungsgesetz
Cottbus	Urban districts: Cottbus	Brandenburg; Districts of Hoyerswerda and Weißwasser to Saxony; District of Jessen to Saxony-Anhalt
Cottbus	Rural districts: Bad Liebenwerda · Calau · Cottbus-Land · Finsterwalde · Forst · Guben (Wokrejs Gubin) · Herzberg · Hoyerswerda · Jessen · Luckau · Lübben · Senftenberg · Spremberg · Weißwasser	Brandenburg; Districts of Hoyerswerda and Weißwasser to Saxony; District of Jessen to Saxony-Anhalt
Dresden	Urban districts: Dresden · Görlitz	Saxony
Dresden	Rural districts: Bautzen · Bischofswerda · Dippoldiswalde · Dresden-Land · Freital · Görlitz-Land · Großenhain · Kamenz · Löbau · Meißen · Niesky · Pirna · Riesa · Sebnitz · Zittau	Saxony
Erfurt	Urban districts: Erfurt · Weimar	Thuringia
Erfurt	Rural districts: Apolda · Arnstadt · Eisenach · Erfurt-Land · Gotha · Heiligenstadt · Langensalza · Mühlhausen · Nordhausen · Sömmerda · Sondershausen · Weimar-Land	Thuringia
Frankfurt (Oder)	Urban districts: Frankfurt (Oder) · Eisenhüttenstadt · Schwedt/Oder	Brandenburg
Frankfurt (Oder)	Rural districts: Angermünde · Bad Freienwalde · Beeskow · Bernau · Eberswalde · Eisenhüttenstadt · Fürstenwalde · Seelow · Strausberg	Brandenburg
Gera	Urban districts: Gera · Jena	Thuringia
Gera	Rural districts: Eisenberg · Gera-Land · Greiz · Jena · Lobenstein · Pößneck · Rudolstadt · Saalfeld · Schleiz · Stadtroda · Zeulenroda	Thuringia
Halle	Urban districts: Halle · Dessau · Halle-Neustadt (from 12 May 1967)	Saxony-Anhalt; District of Artern to Thuringia
Halle	Rural districts: Artern · Aschersleben · Bernburg · Bitterfeld · Eisleben · Gräfenhainichen · Hettstedt · Hohenmölsen · Köthen · Merseburg · Naumburg · Nebra · Quedlinburg · Querfurt · Roßlau · Saalkreis · Sangerhausen · Weißenfels · Wittenberg · Zeitz	Saxony-Anhalt; District of Artern to Thuringia
Karl-Marx-Stadt	Urban districts: Karl-Marx-Stadt · Plauen · Zwickau · Johanngeorgenstadt (until 1957) · Schneeberg (until 1958)	Saxony
Karl-Marx-Stadt	Rural districts: Annaberg · Aue · Auerbach · Brand-Erbisdorf · Flöha · Freiberg · Glauchau · Hainichen · Hohenstein-Ernstthal · Karl-Marx-Stadt-Land · Klingenthal · Marienberg · Oelsnitz · Plauen-Land · Reichenbach · Rochlitz · Schwarzenberg · Stollberg · Werdau · Zschopau · Zwickau-Land	Saxony
Leipzig	Urban districts: Leipzig	Saxony; Districts of Altenburg and Schmölln to Thuringia
Leipzig	Rural districts: Altenburg · Borna · Delitzsch · Döbeln · Eilenburg · Geithain · Grimma · Leipzig-Land · Oschatz · Schmölln · Torgau · Wurzen	Saxony; Districts of Altenburg and Schmölln to Thuringia
Magdeburg	Urban districts: Magdeburg	Saxony-Anhalt
Magdeburg	Rural districts: Burg · Gardelegen · Genthin · Halberstadt · Haldensleben · Havelberg · Kalbe (Milde) (until December 1987) · Klötze · Loburg (until June 1957) · Oschersleben · Osterburg · Salzwedel · Schönebeck · Seehausen (until July 1965) · Staßfurt · Stendal · Tangerhütte (until December 1987) · Wanzleben · Wernigerode · Wolmirstedt · Zerbst	Saxony-Anhalt
Neubrandenburg	Urban districts: Neubrandenburg (from January 1969)	Mecklenburg-Vorpommern; Districts of Prenzlau and Templin to Brandenburg
Neubrandenburg	Rural districts: Altentreptow · Anklam · Demmin · Malchin · Neubrandenburg-Land · Neustrelitz · Pasewalk · Prenzlau · Röbel/Müritz · Strasburg · Templin · Teterow · Ueckermünde · Waren	Mecklenburg-Vorpommern; Districts of Prenzlau and Templin to Brandenburg
Potsdam	Urban districts: Potsdam · Brandenburg an der Havel	Brandenburg
Potsdam	Rural districts: Belzig · Brandenburg · Gransee · Jüterbog · Königs-Wusterhausen · Kyritz · Luckenwalde · Nauen · Neuruppin · Oranienburg · Potsdam · Pritzwalk · Rathenow · Wittstock · Zossen	Brandenburg
Rostock	Urban districts: Rostock · Greifswald (from January 1974) · Stralsund · Wismar	Mecklenburg-Vorpommern
Rostock	Rural districts: Bad Doberan · Greifswald Land · Grevesmühlen · Grimmen · Ribnitz-Damgarten · Rostock-Land · Rügen · Stralsund · Wismar · Wolgast	Mecklenburg-Vorpommern
Schwerin	Urban districts: Schwerin	Mecklenburg-Vorpommern; District of Perleberg to Brandenburg
Schwerin	Rural districts: Bützow · Gadebusch · Güstrow · Hagenow · Ludwigslust · Lübz · Parchim · Perleberg · Schwerin-Land · Sternberg	Mecklenburg-Vorpommern; District of Perleberg to Brandenburg
Suhl	Urban districts: Suhl	Thuringia
Suhl	Rural districts: Bad Salzungen · Hildburghausen · Ilmenau · Meiningen · Neuhaus · Schmalkalden · Sonneberg · Suhl-Land	Thuringia

== List of Bezirke ==
From north to south, the Bezirke were:

Map	Bezirk	Area (km²)	Population (1989)	Population density (people/km²)	Licence plates	Internal divisions (1989)	Municipalities (Gemeinden)
	Rostock	7,075	916,500	130	A	10 Landkreise, 4 Stadtkreise	360
	Schwerin	8,672	595,200	69	B	10 Landkreise, 1 Stadtkreis	389
	Neubrandenburg	10,948	620,500	57	C	14 Landkreise, 1 Stadtkreis	492
	Potsdam	12,568	1,123,800	89	D, P	15 Landkreise, 2 Stadtkreise	755
	Frankfurt (Oder)	7,186	713,800	99	E	9 Landkreise, 3 Stadtkreise	438
	Magdeburg	11,526	1,249,500	108	H, M	17 Landkreise, 1 Stadtkreis	655
	Cottbus	8,262	884,700	107	Z	14 Landkreise, 1 Stadtkreis	574
	Halle	8,771	1,776,500	203	K, V	20 Landkreise, 3 Stadtkreise	684
	Leipzig	4,966	1,360,900	274	S, U	12 Landkreise, 1 Stadtkreis	422
	Erfurt	7,349	1,240,400	169	L, F	13 Landkreise, 2 Stadtkreise	719
	Dresden	6,738	1,757,400	261	R, Y	15 Landkreise, 2 Stadtkreise	594
	Karl-Marx-Stadt*	6,009	1,859,500	309	T, X	21 Landkreise, 3 Stadtkreise| 601	
	Gera	4,004	742,000	185	N	11 Landkreise, 2 Stadtkreise	528
	Suhl	3,856	549,400	142	O	8 Landkreise, 1 Stadtkreis	358
	Berlin**	403	1,279,200	3,174	I	11 Stadtbezirke	1
	DDR	108,333	16,669,300	154	–	191 Landkreise, 27 Stadtkreise (+ Ost-Berlin)	7,570

*) The Bezirk Karl-Marx-Stadt was named Bezirk Chemnitz for a short period at both the beginning and end of the republic, corresponding with the renaming and reversal of the city Chemnitz. Between 10 May 1953 and 30 May 1990, both the city and Bezirk were named Karl-Marx-Stadt.
**) East Berlin was not officially a Bezirk, but from 1961 was provided with the function of one.

== Reconstitution of the Länder ==
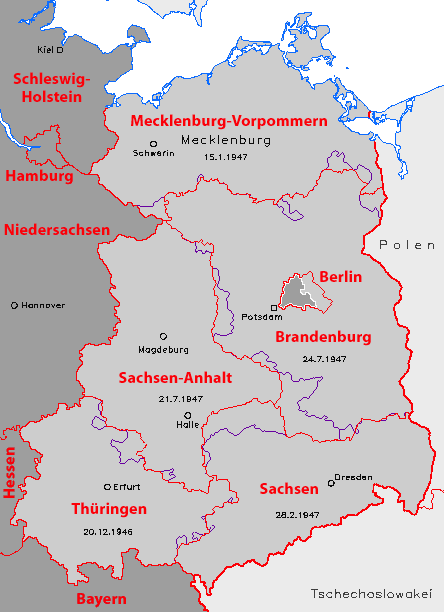
The reconstituted Länder in 1990, with borders in red. The purple borders show the original borders pre-1952.

On 23 August 1990 — just over a month before German reunification on 3 October — East Germany reconstituted the five original Länder. Legally, it was these Länder that then acceded to the Federal Republic of Germany.

In reality, the restored Länder did not fully reconstitute themselves until after reunification. On 14 October 1990, elections to the Landtage (state parliaments) were held in the five new states, initiating the formation of state governments.

Since changes to the boundaries of municipal districts were not reversed, and also due to considerations of expediency, the territorial make-up of the restored Länder differed somewhat from the borders before 1952.

Saxony and Saxony-Anhalt initially retained the rural and urban districts as administrative entities (Regierungsbezirke). Saxony-Anhalt later abolished them in 2003, while Saxony transformed them into directorates in 2008.

== See also ==
- List of leaders of administrative divisions of East Germany
