= Bezirk Schwerin =

District of East Germany

District of Schwerin Bezirk Schwerin
- District (Bezirk) of East Germany
- 1952–1990
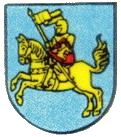
- Coat of arms

- Location of Bezirk Schwerin within the German Democratic Republic
- Capital: Schwerin
- Area
  - 1989: 8,672 km^{2} (3,348 sq mi)
- Population
  - 1989: 595,200
- Government
- SED First Secretary
  - 1952–1974: Bernhard Quandt
  - 1974–1989: Heinz Ziegner
  - 1989: Hans-Jürgen Audehm
- Chairman of the Council of the Bezirk
  - 1952–1958: Wilhelm Bick
  - 1958–1960: Josef Stadler
  - 1960–1968: Michael Grieb
  - 1968–1989: Rudi Fleck
  - 1989–1990: Siegfried Hempelt (acting)
  - 1990: Georg Diederich (as Regierungsbevollmächtigter)
- History
  - Established: 1952
  - Disestablished: 1990
Preceded by
Mecklenburg (1945-1952)
Brandenburg (1945-1952)
Succeeded by
Mecklenburg-Vorpommern
Brandenburg
Lower Saxony
- Today part of: Germany

The Bezirk Schwerin was a district (Bezirk) of East Germany. The administrative seat and the main town was Schwerin.

== History ==
The district was established, with the other 13, on 25 July 1952, substituting the old German states. After 3 October 1990, it was disestablished due to the German reunification. Most of the Bezirk Schwerin became part of the state of Mecklenburg-Vorpommern, with the exception of the district of Perleberg, which went to Brandenburg and Amt Neuhaus, which went to Lower Saxony in former West Germany.

== Geography ==
=== Position ===
The Bezirk Schwerin bordered with the Bezirke of Rostock, Neubrandenburg, Potsdam and Magdeburg. It bordered also with West Germany.

=== Subdivision ===
The Bezirk was divided into 11 Kreise: 1 urban district (Stadtkreise) and 10 rural districts (Landkreise):

- Urban district : Schwerin.
- Rural districts : Bützow; Gadebusch; Güstrow; Hagenow; Ludwigslust; Lübz; Parchim; Perleberg; Schwerin-Land; Sternberg.
