= Bezirk Rostock =

District of East Germany

District of Rostock Bezirk Rostock
- District (Bezirk) of East Germany
- 1952–1990
- Flag Coat of arms

- Location of Bezirk Rostock within the German Democratic Republic
- Capital: Rostock
- Area
  - 1989: 7,075 km^{2} (2,732 sq mi)
- Population
  - 1989: 916,500
- Government
- SED First Secretary
  - 1952–1961: Karl Mewis
  - 1961–1975: Harry Tisch
  - 1975–1989: Ernst Timm
  - 1989–1990: Ulrich Peck
- Chairman of the Council of the Bezirk
  - 1952: Erhard Holweger
  - 1952–1959: Hans Warnke
  - 1959–1961: Harry Tisch
  - 1961–1969: Karl Deuscher
  - 1969–1986: Willy Marlow
  - 1986–1989: Eberhard Kühl
  - 1989–1990: Götz Kreuer
  - 1990: Hans-Joachim Kalendrusch (as Regierungsbevollmächtigter)
- History
  - Established: 1952
  - Disestablished: 1990
Preceded by	Succeeded by
Mecklenburg (1945–1952)	Mecklenburg-Vorpommern
- Today part of: Germany

The Bezirk Rostock was a district (Bezirk) of East Germany. The administrative seat and the main town was Rostock.

== History ==
The district was established, with the other 13, on 25 July 1952, substituting the old German states. After 3 October 1990 it was dissolved following German reunification, becoming again part of the state of Mecklenburg-Vorpommern.

== Geography ==
=== Position ===
The Bezirk Rostock, the northernmost of DDR, was situated on the coast of the Baltic Sea, in front of the Danish coasts. It bordered with the Bezirke of Schwerin and Neubrandenburg. It bordered also with Poland and West Germany.

=== Subdivision ===
The Bezirk was divided into 14 Kreise: 4 urban districts (Stadtkreise) and 10 rural districts (Landkreise):

- Urban districts : Greifswald; Rostock; Stralsund; Wismar.
- Rural districts : Bad Doberan; Greifswald; Grevesmühlen; Grimmen; Ribnitz-Damgarten; Rostock-Land; Rügen; Stralsund; Wismar; Wolgast.
