= Wilhelm Höcker =

German politician (1886–1955)

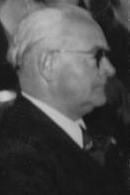
Wilhelm Höcker (1949)

Wilhelm Höcker (29 June 1886 in Holzendorf, Mecklenburg-Schwerin – 15 November 1955 in Güstrow) was a German politician (SPD, SED) and former Minister-President of Mecklenburg from 1946 to 1951.

Höcker was the oldest former Minister-President of East Germany from the formation of the GDR until 12 April 1966; he was succeeded by Karl Steinhoff.
