= Gehrke =

Gehrke is a German surname. Notable people with the surname include:

- Axel Gehrke (1942–2021), German politician
- Bruce Gehrke (1924–1976), American football player and coach
- Charles W. Gehrke (1917–2009), American chemist
- Chris Gehrke (1966–1991), American racing driver
- Erwin Gehrke (1898–1966), American football player
- Fred Gehrke (1918–2002), American football player and executive
- Hans-Joachim Gehrke (born 1945), German archaeologist
- Herbert Gehrke (1910–1945), German Nazi activist and SA commander
- Holger Gehrke (born 1960), German footballer and manager
- Johannes Gehrke (contemporary), German scientist
- Mai Gehrke (born 1964), Danish mathematician
- Michael Gehrke (contemporary), American political consultant
- Roland Gehrke (born 1954), East German sport wrestler
- Steve Gehrke (born 1971), American poet
