= Fritz Stichtenoth =

German Nazi Party politician

Minister of State Mecklenburg-Strelitz
- In office 29 May 1933 – 31 December 1933
- Preceded by: Heinrich von Michael
- Succeeded by: Office abolished

State Councilor Free State of Mecklenburg-Strelitz
- In office 8 April 1932 – 29 May 1933

Personal details
- Born: 17 November 1895 Geismar, Province of Saxony, Kingdom of Prussia, German Empire
- Died: 29 July 1935 (aged 39) Schwerin, Mecklenburg, Nazi Germany
- Party: Nazi Party
- Education: Humboldt University of Berlin; University of Göttingen
- Profession: Economist

Military service
- Allegiance: German Empire
- Branch/service: Imperial German Army
- Years of service: 1914–1918
- Unit: 11th (1st Kurhessian) Field Artillery; Reserve Field Artillery Regiment 57
- Battles/wars: World War I
- Awards: Iron Cross, 2nd class

Fritz Stichtenoth (17 November 1895 – 29 July 1935) was a German economist and Nazi Party politician who served as the Minister of State of the Free State of Mecklenburg-Strelitz. He headed its last administration before it was merged into the neighboring Free State of Mecklenburg-Schwerin on 1 January 1934.

== Early life ==
Stichtenoth was born in Großtöpfer, a section of the municipality of Geismar in 1895. After attending Volksschule in Eschwege and the Oberrealschule in Kassel, he obtained his Abitur in 1914. Shortly after Germany entered the First World War in August 1914, Stichtenoth joined the 11th (1st Kurhessian) Field Artillery of the Imperial German Army, headquartered in Kassel, on 1 September. He was transferred to Reserve Field Artillery Regiment 57 on 1 February 1915 and fought on the eastern front but was captured as a prisoner of war by the Russians on 1 October 1915. He was awarded the Iron Cross, 2nd class, returned to Germany in July 1918 and was discharged from the army on 15 December. He studied economics at the Humboldt University of Berlin and the University of Göttingen, receiving a doctorate there in 1925. From 1927, Stichtenoth worked for the Agricultural League in Pomerania and Mecklenburg.

== Nazi Party career ==
At the 1932 Mecklenburg-Strelitz state election, Stichtenoth was elected as a Nazi Party deputy to the Landtag of the Free State of Mecklenburg-Strelitz. On 8 April 1932, he joined the State Council as a Staatsrat (State Councilor) in the coalition government headed by Minister of State Heinrich von Michael of the conservative German National People's Party (DNVP).

After the Nazis came to power at the national level, they passed the Provisional Law on the Coordination of the States with the Reich, under which the state Landtage were dissolved and reconstituted based on the recent Reichstag election of 5 March 1933, which resulted in a working majority for the Nazi Party in most states. On 11 May 1933, the newly elected Nazi president of the Mecklenburg-Strelitz Landtag attempted to displace Minister of State Michael, who resisted and protested that only a Reichsstatthalter (Reich Governor) was empowered to dismiss him. Since none had yet been appointed, he still regarded himself as the legitimate head of government and matters stood at an impasse. On 26 May, Friedrich Hildebrandt was appointed as Reichsstatthalter and, on 29 May, he appointed Stichtenoth as Minister of State. However, Stichtenoth's triumph was to prove short-lived. Hildebrandt, who held the governorships of both Mecklenburg-Strelitz and the much larger and more populous Free State of Mecklenburg-Schwerin, sought to consolidate his jurisdictions. Accordingly, on 1 January 1934, Mecklenburg-Strelitz was incorporated into its larger neighbor, and Stichtenoth's government was abolished. He then worked as a Ministerial Director in the government of the united Mecklenburg, and he died in Schwerin in July 1935.

== Written works ==
- Die Entwicklung der Lehre vom Kapitalzins seit Böhm-Bawerk. (1923) Göttingen, Rechts- und Staatswissenschaftliche Dissertation.

== Sources ==
- Broszat, Martin (1981). The Hitler State: The Foundation and Development of the Internal Structure of the Third Reich. New York: Longman Inc. ISBN 978-0-582-48997-4.
- Das Deutsche Führerlexikon 1934-1935. Berlin: Verlagsanftalt Otto Stollberg G. m. b. H. 1934.
- Gonschior, Andreas: Der Freistaat Mecklenburg-Strelitz Die Staatsministerien 1918–1933 in Der Freistaat Mecklenburg-Strelitz Überblick
- Grewolls, Greta (1995). Wer war wer in Mecklenburg-Vorpommern? Ein Personenlexikon. Bremen: Edition Temmen. ISBN 978-3-861-08282-8.
- Miller, Michael D.; Schulz, Andreas (2012). Gauleiter: The Regional Leaders of the Nazi Party and Their Deputies, 1925–1945. Vol. 1 (Herbert Albrecht - H. Wilhelm Hüttmann). R. James Bender Publishing. ISBN 978-1-932-97021-0.
