= Friedrich Wehmer =

Chairman of the Peasants Mutual Aid Association
- In office 1950–1964
- Preceded by: Otto Körting
- Succeeded by: Ernst Wulf

Member of the Volkskammer
- In office 1949–1964

Member of the Landtag of Mecklenburg-Vorpommern
- In office 1946–1950

Mayor of Plate
- In office 1945–1946
- Preceded by: Otto Ihde & Ernst Hildebrand
- Succeeded by: Johann Kort
- In office 1919–1933
- Succeeded by: Friedrich Behring

Member of the Landtag of the Free State of Mecklenburg-Schwerin
- In office 1920–1933

Personal details
- Born: December 25, 1885 Plate (Schwerin), Mecklenburg-Schwerin, German Empire
- Died: February 7, 1964 (aged 78) Schwerin, Mecklenburg-Vorpommern, German Democratic Republic
- Party: Socialist Unity Party (1946–); Social Democratic Party of Germany (1919–1946)
- Other political affiliations: Peasants Mutual Aid Association
- Occupation: Politician
- Awards: Order of Karl Marx (1960); Medal for Fighters Against Fascism (1958); Patriotic Order of Merit, in silver (1954)
- Military Service
- Allegiance: German Empire
- Branch: Imperial German Army
- Service years: 1914–1918 & 1905–1907
- Conflicts: First World War

Friedrich Wehmer (25 December 1885 – 7 February 1964) was a German politician of the SPD during the Weimar period and in the German Democratic Republic, where he served as a member of the Volkskammer.

== Life ==
=== Early years ===
Friedrich Wehmer was born during the closing years of the Bismarck era, near Schwerin, in the coastal region of central northern Germany. His father worked in forestry and in brick making. Wehmer was schooled locally between 1892 and 1900, and then trained for farm work till 1903. From then on he was employed intermittently by the Buchholz Forestry Office till 1941. In parallel to that, between 1912 and 1955 he worked a small holding on his own account as a tenant farmer.

=== Military service and politics ===
From 1905 till 1907 he undertook his military service, and was then called up in 1914 when the First World War began, serving in the army till 1918. After the war he began to take an interest in politics. In the revolutionary year of 1918 he joined a workers' and soldiers' council. He returned to Plate and became chairman of his Forestry Office. In February 1919 he joined the Social Democratic Party (SPD). Later that year he also joined the Agricultural Workers' Union.

In October 1919 Wehmer was elected mayor of Plate. He would retain that position till 1933. In 1920 he also became a member of the SPD group in the regional assembly (Landtag) for Mecklenburg-Schwerin. Again, he retained the position till 1933, becoming in 1923 the leader of the SPD group in the chamber. In connection with his political work Wehmer also served as chairman of the regional "Krankenkasse" (state mandated health insurance provider). He was a member of the Mecklenburg-Schwein region Agriculture Chamber of Commerce and for the Agricultural Tribunal.

=== Nazi Germany and the aftermath ===
In January 1933 the NSDAP (Nazi party) seized power and moved fast to create a one-party state. As a member of the SPD Friedrich Wehmer was, from the government's point of view, a member of the wrong party and he was relieved of all his official functions later in the year. He concentrated on forestry work, at least till 1941. After that, now aged 56, he took charge of the "Raifessen" (agricultural produce) cooperative in Plate, remaining in post till 1944. In July 1944 there was a serious (though unsuccessful) assassination attempt against Reichs Chancellor Hitler. One of the government's responses was Aktion Gitter which involved rounding up and interning large numbers of suspected dissidents. Wehmer was taken into "protective custody" ("Schutzhaft") and held, locally. in the prison at Dreibergen (Bützow) till 1945. At the start of 1945 the population of Plate had stood at around 800. By August 1945 the figure had been swollen to as much as 2,400 by refugees streaming through, as part of the enforced relocation of millions of ethic Germans from parts of what had been Germany that were now controlled by the Soviet army and being integrated into Poland and the Soviet Union. Many of those passing through were sick and had lost children and parents. There was a desperate shortage of food and shelter. In political terms, although the entire region would end up in the Soviet occupation zone, when the fighting stopped in May 1945 Plate found itself at the meeting point of the American and Soviet forces. In the summer of 1945 typhoid was rife. Into all this, on 16 August 1945, Friedrich Wehmer, recently released from prison, was returned by the occupation forces to the position of mayor from which he had been removed by the Nazis twelve years earlier. In October 1945 the local school was reopened, with just one classroom for 223 pupils and hardly any books: teaching took place in shifts.

=== Postwar local politics ===
As soon as it became legal to do so, Wehmer had also rejoined the SPD, re-establishing a party committee in the village of Plate and becoming its chairman. He remained mayor, this time, only till April 1946. It was probably on account of his extensive experience with agriculture and the politics of land holding, and also because of his work as a regional deputy during the Weimar years that in September 1945 he was called upon to join the newly formed national Land Commission for the roll-out of land reform across the Soviet occupation zone, which was now in the process of mutating into the German Democratic Republic, under Walter Ulbricht with the backing of the Soviet military. At the same time, now no longer being the local mayor, he involved himself in the newly formed Peasants Mutual Aid Association (VdgB). In April 1946, following the forced merger in East Germany of the SPD with the old KPD (Communist party), Wehmer became a member of the Socialist Unity Party of Germany (SED).

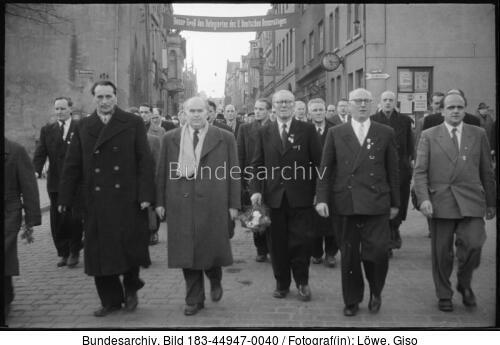
Friedrich Wehmer (center), with Ernst Goldenbaum (Left) and Erich Knorr (Right), Leading march, on the 5th German Farmers’ Day in Güstrow.

Wehmer acted as the regional secretary of the VdgB from May 1946. In October 1946 he was elected to the regional assembly (Landtag) as a member of the VdgB. The VdgB was not, and never became, a conventional political party, but under the political system unfolding in the Soviet occupation zone it was one of the mass movements entitled to have members elected (or, later, nominated) to sit in regional and national assemblies. By this time he was already an executive committee member of the Landtag's Advisory Assembly. He continued as a member of the regional assembly till 1950. The Assembly itself limped on for only another two years before being abolished under a sweeping downgrade of local government institutions in 1952.

From 1947 till 1950, along with his work in the regional assembly, he was the chairman of the regional Ececutive of the VdgB in Mecklenburg. In November 1947 he was also voted on to the VdgB Central (i.e. national) Committee as a deputy chairman.

=== National politics ===
Wehmer was part of the German People's Council and the Volkskammer which succeeded it in 1949, and from October 1950 till 1963 he was the Section leader of the VdgB group and comrade organisations. The National assembly was controlled (and its membership dominated) by the ruling SED party, but the presence in the National Assembly of members representing officially sanctioned mass organisations, including the VdgB, gave the assembly a greater measure of plurality. Between 1950 and 1958 he was also deputy chairman of the Volkskammer's Clemency Committee (Gnadenausschuss).

In November 1950 he was elected to the chairmanship of the VdgB Central committee, a position he retained till his death in 1964. He was also, between June 1954 and his death, a member of the Central Committee of the ruling SED.

== Awards and honours ==
- Master Builder (1951)
- Patriotic Order of Merit in Silver (1954)
- Medal for Fighters Against Fascism (1958)
- Order of Karl Marx (1960)

A street has been named after him in his birth town.

== Reading list ==
- Martin Broszat and others (edited): SBZ-Handbuch: Staatliche Verwaltungen, Parteien, gesellschaftliche Organisationen und ihre Führungskräfte in der Sowjetischen Besatzungszone Deutschlands 1945–1949. Oldenbourg, Munich 1993, page 1053.
- Klaus Schwabe: Zwischen Krone und Hakenkreuz. Die Tätigkeit der sozialdemokratischen Fraktion im Mecklenburg-Schwerinschen Landtag 1919–1932. Verlag A. Tykve, Böblingen 1994, page 199.
- Martin Schumacher: M.d.L. Das Ende der Parlamente 1933 und die Abgeordneten der Landtage und Bürgerschaften der Weimarer Republik in der Zeit des Nationalsozialismus. Politische Verfolgung, Emigration und Ausbürgerung 1933–1945. Droste, Düsseldorf 1995, page 172.
- Friederike Sattler: Wirtschaftsordnung im Übergang. Politik, Organisation und Funktion der KPD/SED im Land Brandenburg bei der Etablierung der zentralen Planwirtschaft in der SBZ/DDR 1945–52. Lit, Münster 2002, page 969.
- Berit Olschewski: „Freunde“ im Feindesland. Rote Armee und deutsche Nachkriegsgesellschaft im ehemaligen Großherzogtum Mecklenburg-Strelitz 1945–1953. BWV Verlag, Berlin 2008, page 528.
- Handbuch der Volkskammer der Deutschen Demokratischen Republik, 3. Wahlperiode, Kongress-Verlag Berlin, 1959

Political offices
Preceded by Otto Körting	Chairman of the Peasants Mutual Aid Association; 1950–1964	Succeeded by Ernst Wulf
