= Otto Körting =

German politician (1884–1959)

Chairman of the Peasants Mutual Aid Association
- In office 1947–1950
- Preceded by: position established
- Succeeded by: Friedrich Wehmer

Member of the Landtag of Saxony-Anhalt
- In office 1946–1950

Member of the Landtag of the Free State of Anhalt
- In office 1919–1932

Personal details
- Born: 20 May 1884 Jeßnitz, Duchy of Anhalt, German Empire
- Died: 3 July 1959 (aged 75) Dessau, Bezirk Halle, East Germany
- Party: Socialist Unity Party of Germany (1946–1950); Social Democratic Party of Germany (1902–1946)
- Other political affiliations: Peasants Mutual Aid Association
- Occupation: Politician

Otto Körting (20 May 1884 – 3 July 1959) was a German politician.

After 1933 Germany became a one-party state. Körting was a member of the SPD which in the eyes of the new government was one of the larger "wrong" parties. He was accordingly excluded from public political roles during the ensuing twelve years, spending several significant stretches of time held in state detention.

After 1945 German borders had been moved and Körting found his home was in the Soviet occupation zone of what had previously been Germany. He was now a co-founder, and became the first president, of the territory's newly established Peasants Mutual Aid Association. In 1950, however, he again fell out of favour with the political authorities, in a second German one-party dictatorship, which ended his career, this time for good.

== Life ==
=== Early years ===
Körting was born in Jeßnitz, a small town approximately 60 km (38 miles) north of Leipzig. His father was small-scale farmer. He attended the local school in Bobbau before embarking on an apprenticeship at the photographic film factory at Wolfen, which at that time (and all the way through till 1945) was part of the Agfa company. He would continue to work for Agfa till 1933, while also maintaining a small farm.

=== Politics ===
In 1902, the year of his eighteenth birthday, Otto Körting joined both the Social Democratic Party (SPD / Sozialdemokratische Partei Deutschlands ) and the German Metal Workers' Union. Starting in 1908 he began to undertake political and trades union work. Between 1909 and 1926 he was a local councillor, representing the SPD in Bobbau, after which he became an official and community leader in the village.

=== Régime change 1 ===
On the international stage, war ended in 1918 with defeat for Germany which led to a year of heightened political and social turmoil, followed by the adoption, in August 1919, of a relatively democratic constitutional structure. Körting embarked on a career in regional politics, standing successfully as an SPD candidate for the Anhalt regional legislature. He continued to sit as a member of the legislature (albeit with a couple of brief breaks) till April 1932. He also took part in trades union congresses, as a works council president for the Wolfen Agfa plant. On top of his political and union roles, he worked at this time as a lay judge.

=== Régime change 2 ===
With the change of government in January 1933, Körting's SPD and union activities became illegal: he resigned from all his political positions and lost his job at Agfa. Later in 1933 he was detained for eight months at the Oranienburg concentration camp. On his release he was able to find work as an agricultural labourer, and later during the Nazi years he worked as manager of an agricultural enterprise. As a former SPD member of a legislative assembly he lived under on-going Gestapo supervision, however, and was subjected to several more periods of state detention. War resumed in 1939, and towards the end of the war period, in July 1944, he was caught up in the wave of arrests (and worse) that followed the failure of the Hitler Assassination plot in July 1944. In July or August Otto Körting was arrested and placed in the Buchenwald concentration camp: sources differ as to whether his detention lasted for four months or longer. After his release he settled down at his little farm in Bobbau.

=== Régime change 3 ===
The end of the Second World War appeared to mark the end of one-party government. Körting re-engaged with the no longer illegal SPD and became a member of the newly founded Peasants Mutual Aid Association. He also participated in land reform implementation, as a member of the State Land Commission for Saxony.

In April 1946 the controversial creation of the Socialist Unity Party of Germany (SED / Sozialistische Einheitspartei Deutschlands) opened the way for a retreat from political pluralism in the Soviet occupation zone. Otto Körting was one of thousands who that same year signed their SPD membership across to the new SED. The authorities were largely successful in blocking any re-emergence of the old SPD in the Soviet controlled zone. Nevertheless, subsequent events suggest that Körting may not, at this stage, have entirely broken his links with whatever remained of the SPD in this part of Germany.

Körting also stood for election, successfully, to the Landtag of Saxony-Anhalt. By October 1949, when the Soviet occupation zone was re-founded as the Soviet sponsored German Democratic Republic, considerable progress had been made in moving the territory's constitutional arrangements towards a model closely based on those of the Soviet Union itself. One aspect of this was insistence on the leading role of the ruling party, which effectively, and later expressly, meant that the national assembly and any regional legislative assemblies, along with government ministers, all operated according to the strictures of the SED Central Committee. Opposition parties were not banned, but they were reinvented as "Bloc parties", grouped into a controlling structure called the National Front. Their representation in the national legislature was based not on election results but on predetermined quotas of seats. Another feature that Lenin had incorporated into the Soviet Constitution was the introduction of various officially established "mass organizations", entitled to a quota of seats in national and regional legislative assemblies as a way to assert the broadest possible support for party policy. A constitutional structure incorporating Mass movements had not yet been created even in the Soviet occupation zone as early as 1946, but in the Regional elections in Saxony, the Peasants Mutual Aid Association(VdgB / Vereinigung der gegenseitigen Bauernhilfe) participated as though it were a political party. It received 2.5% of the vote and Otto Körting, despite being a known member of the SED (party) was one of two assembly members who would sit as representative members of the VdgB. The next year, in November 1947, the Association held its first "Bauerntag" in Berlin, which in effect was a quasi-party congress by another name. Körting was elected first president of the VdgB. He had already, in 1946, been elected one of several vice-presidents of the Landtag of Saxony-Anhalt (regional legislature).

The VdgB was the first Soviet style Mass movement in what would become the German Democratic Republic and it had a genuine mass membership in the country's important farming sector, a sector visibly more important at a time of widespread hunger and forced migration than it would become as the peacetime economy settled down. It was therefore natural that as VdgB president Otto Körting was also allocated a seat in the German People's Council, established in 1946 to create a constitution, and the forerunner of the new country's People's Chamber (National Legislative Assembly / Volkskammer). He also worked as a member of the powerful (but short-lived) German Economic Commission.

=== Fall ===
The months following the foundation of the German Democratic Republic coincided with heightened political nervousness on the part of the authorities as the ruling SED struggled uncompromisingly to establish de facto control over the Bloc parties. In March 1950 Otto Körting was replaced as chairman of the VdgB's central committee because of his "uncomprehending attitude over the question of democratising the villages". Four months later, in July 1950, he was excluded from the ruling SED itself because of alleged "reactionary activities". This was also when he lost his seat in the Landtag of Saxony-Anhalt. (The Landtag itself would be abolished, along with an entire regional tier of government, less than two years later.) As an insufficiently reformed (former) Social Democrat he fell victim to a culture of party purges and false accusations. In 1952 he was arrested and held for a year in "investigatory detention". He was released after a year but never returned to politics. Otto Körting died at Dessau in the summer of 1959.

Political offices
Preceded by office created	Chairman of the Peasants Mutual Aid Association; 1947–1950	Succeeded by Friedrich Wehmer
