= Richard Aßmann (works council chairman) =

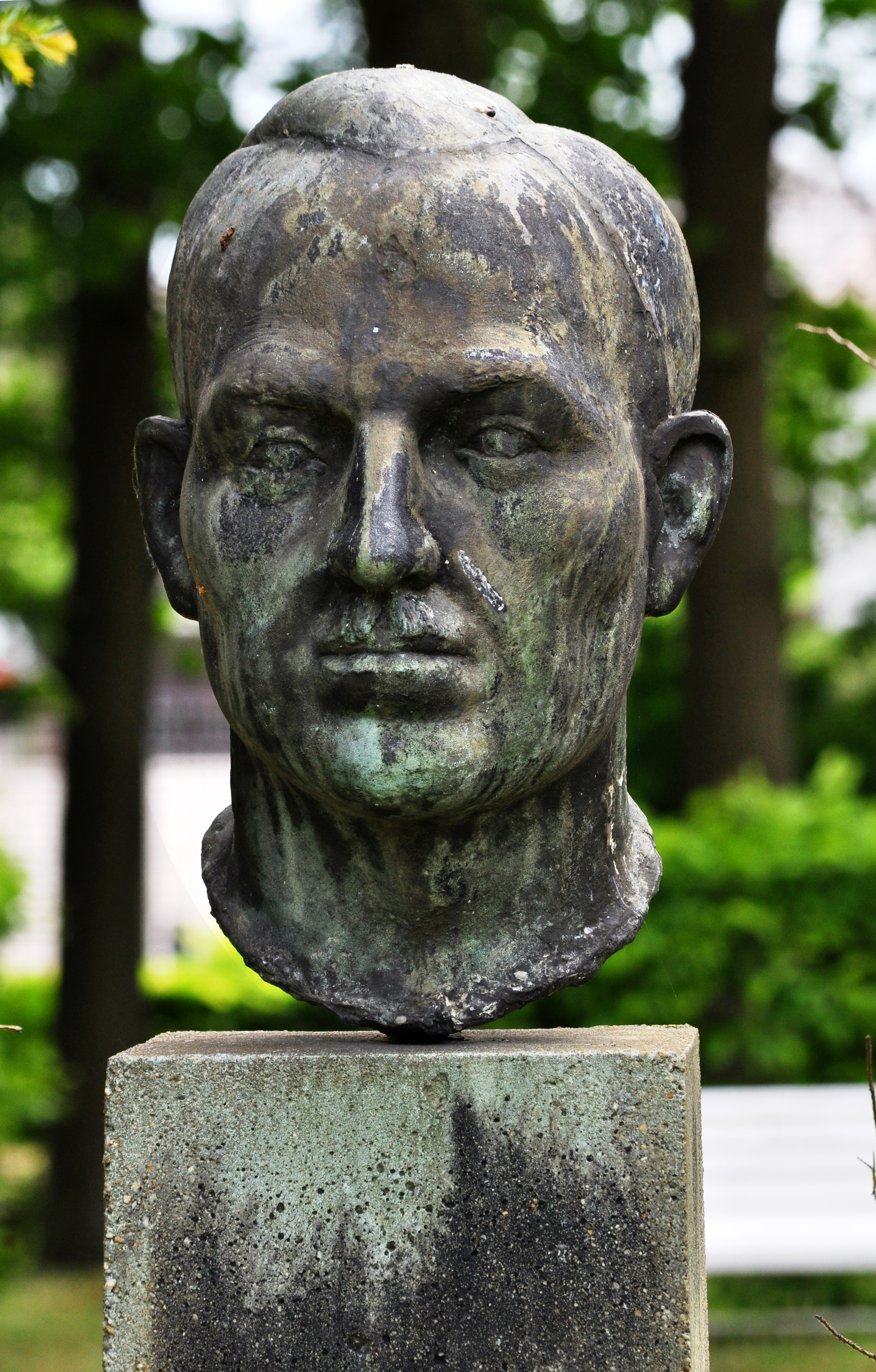
- Bust of Richard Aßmann by Wolfgang Eckardt (1978)
- Born: 16 December 1875; Berlin, Germany
- Died: 21 June 1933 (aged 57); Berlin-Köpenick, Germany
- Occupations: Works council Chairman with the AOK; Anti-Nazi activist
- Known for: his torture and murder by Nazi thugs Köpenick's week of bloodshed
- Spouse: Selma
- Children: Hildegard; Kurt

Richard Aßmann (16 December 1875 – 21 June 1933) became a works council chairman (German: Betriebsratsvorsitzender) with the national Health Insurance provider AOK in Berlin. He also involved himself in politics and was a member of the centre-left Social Democratic Party (Sozialdemokratische Partei Deutschlands; SPD).

On 20 June 1933 he was forcibly removed from a tram by Nazi paramilitaries and taken away. His body was found, badly degraded, in a sack in the Dahme river on 11 July 1933. His daughter, Hilde Aßmann, was required to identify the body, which she was able to do because she recognised his wrist watch. Although the precise date of his death was never established, Richard Aßmann is generally seen as the first of an estimated 500 victims – at least 23 of whom were murdered while in detention and subsequently identified – of Köpenick's week of bloodshed (die Köpenicker Blutwoche), one of the first recorded mass-atrocities carried out by the Nazis after they took power in January 1933.

== Life ==
Richard Aßmann was a clerical worker employed by the AOK in Berlin. During Germany's inter-war democratic period his fellow workers elected him as an employee representative to the organisation's works council (Betriebsrat). Subsequently, they elected him to the chairmanship of it. At the start of 1933 the Nazis took power and lost no time in transforming Germany into a one-party dictatorship. Directly after the Reichstag fire, at the end of February 1933, arrests began of people who had been active in the Communist Party before 1933. Throughout the twelve Nazi years, official persecution would be focused most intensely on citizens identified as "Communists" and / or "Jews". But citizens with records of political activism in other parties were also at heightened risk. His home was on one side of the market place in Friedrichshagen which was at that time administered as part of the Berlin suburb of Köpenick. Köpenick was believed by the new government (and others) to contain particularly large numbers of Communists and Jews. Richard Aßmann had always been particularly trenchant in his criticism of Adolf Hitler and was a known "anti-fascist". He was a local leader in the pro-democracy Reichsbanner Schwarz-Rot-Gold organisation. On the early morning of 21 June 1933 several Nazi "SA" paramilitaries boarded a tram on which Aßmann was travelling and forcibly removed him from it.

According to one source he was taken to the Seidler Restaurant in the Mahlsdorfer Straße which served as an informal center for the SA.He was badly tortured. He may then have been one of a number of detainees taken that night to the prison of the district court which had been taken over by the SA for use as a temporary headquarters. According to another source he was taken to the "SA" building on the north shore of the Müggelsee where he was tortured and murdered. Much of the detail of how Aßmann was tortured and killed remains unclear. At a trial held seventeen years later, the court was informed that Aßmann was "one of the first to be taken on 21 June 1933 to the SA building along Seestraße [following an intervening change of the street name identified in 1950 as 'Müggelseedamm 132'], where he was abducted and subjected to mistreatment" ("...gehörte zu den ersten, die am 21.6.1933 in das SA-Heim Seestraße, heute Müggelseedamm 132, verschleppt und dort misshandelt wurden"). It was established by the trial in 1950 that one of his murderers was an SA drum major and World War I veteran called Fritz Liebenhagen. The court heard from witnesses that Liebenhagen emerged from a session with Aßmann with blood spattered on his uniform and boasted to subordinates, "That's human blood. With these hands I've killed this Marxist. Workers' blood sticks to my hands" ("Das ist Menschenblut. Mit diesen Hände habe ich diesen Marxisten erschlagen. An meinen Händen klebt Arbeiterblut").

His body was found on 11 July 1933 in or beside the Dahme river, possibly by fishermen. The body had been placed in a sack before apparently being thrown into the river. Aßmann's widow was invited to identify the body but it was badly mutilated and she was unable to do so. A researcher was told in 1992 by a contemporary witness called Hildegard Feil that her father had therefore accompanied Hildegard Aßmann-Abusch, Richard Aßmann's recently married daughter, to try and identify the body. They had been able to do so, but only because they had recognised his wrist watch.

The body was buried at the Friedrichsfelde Municipal Cemetery.

== Connections ==
Richard Aßmann's daughter, Hildegard Aßmann (1907–1989), married Alexander Abusch in 1931. At the time Abusch was a Communist Party activist: he would spend most of the twelve Nazi years as a political exile, first in France and later in Mexico. After the war ended, he was able to return to Berlin in July 1946, becoming a member of the ruling Socialist Unity Party (Sozialistische Einheitspartei Deutschlands; SED) in the Soviet occupation zone: he was for many years after 1949 a stalwart of the East German political establishment.

== Celebration and commemoration ==
Since 1951 there has been a memorial tablet to Richard Aßmann at Graal-Müritz complemented, since 1978, by a memorial bust by Wolfgang Eckardt. The tablet was placed in the grounds of what is now known as the "Rehaklinik" ('Rehabilitation Clinic') when a hospital and rehabilitation facility that had been commandeered after 1945 and used by the Soviet army was handed back to the municipal authorities and converted into a sanatorium. At this point the facility was renamed after Richard Aßmann as a high-profile victim of Nazi atrocities. There is otherwise no identified connection between Richard Aßmann and the coastal resort of Graal-Müritz.

In Berlin-Friedrichshagen, near where the murder is believed to have taken place, Aßmannstraße was renamed after Richard Aßmann in 1947. It had previously been known as Friedrich-Straße. The street also features a memorial tablet and, added in 2013, a "Stolperstein" commemorating Aßmann.
