= Ernst Wulf =

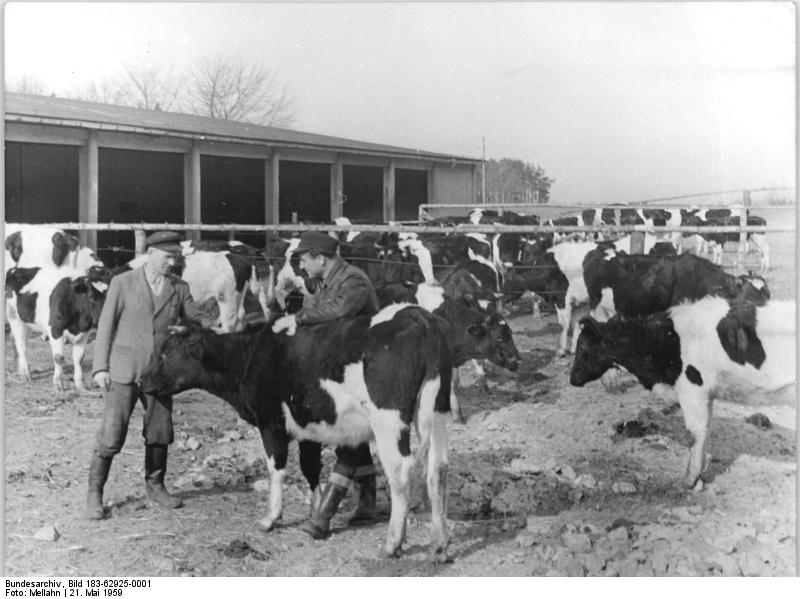
- Wulf at a dairy farm, on the right (1959)

Chairman of the Peasants Mutual Aid Association
- In office 1964–1979
- Preceded by: Friedrich Wehmer
- Succeeded by: Fritz Zeuner

Personal details
- Born: October 3, 1921 Poppendorf, Free State of Mecklenburg-Schwerin, Weimar Republic
- Died: October 2, 1979 (aged 57) East Germany
- Party: Socialist Unity Party (1949–)
- Other political affiliations: Peasants Mutual Aid Association
- Education: University of Rostock
- Occupation: Farmer, politician
- Awards: Order of Karl Marx (1969); Patriotic Order of Merit, in bronze (1959); Hero of Labour (1954)
- Military Service
- Allegiance: Nazi Germany
- Branch: Wehrmacht
- Conflicts: Second World War; Italian Campaign (POW)

Ernst Wulf (3 October 1921 – 2 October 1979) was an East German farmer and political activist who served as chairman of the Peasants Mutual Aid Association, a mass organization within the National Front, from 1964 to 1979.

During the reign of the Third Reich, Wulf was a member of the Reich Labour Service, and fought in the Wehrmacht in World War II, before being captured. After the war, he worked in Hanover for two years before moving to his home town, in the newly created German Democratic Republic. He joined the SED and became noted in the country for his contributions to agricultural output. He was a candidate for the Central Committee of the party in 1958.

In 1960, he was elected deputy chairman of the VdgB, and in 1964 he became chairman, a post he would hold until his death in 1979.

== Awards and honours ==
- Master Builder (1952)
- Patriotic Order of Merit in Bronze (1959)
- Order of Karl Marx (1969)

Political offices
Preceded by Friedrich Wehmer	Chairman of the Peasants Mutual Aid Association; 1964–1979	Succeeded by Fritz Zeuner
