= Paul Schwencke =

Paul Schwencke (German: [ˈpaʊ̯l ˈʃvɛŋ.kɛ]; 7 June 1884 – 9 September 1957) was a farmer and politician, who was a member of the German Democratic Party. He was a member of the Landtag (parliament) of the Free State of Mecklenburg-Schwerin.

== History ==
Paul Schwencke was born on 7 June 1884 in Vellahn, Grand Duchy of Mecklenburg-Schwerin, German Empire (now part of Mecklenburg-Vorpommern, Germany). He lived in Stoltenau, near Vellahn, and was a farmer and a leasholder under the emphyteusis system.

Since 1911, Schwencke was actively involved in the liberal movement, and was the board member of the local branch of the German Democratic Party. He was also a member of the Vellahn municipal council.

In 1919, he became a member of the Landtag (parliament) of the Free State of Mecklenburg-Schwerin. In 1920, he acted as a substitute for Hans Sivkovich, in the Landtag. He continued to be a member of the Landtag in the following years, including in 1927 and 1931.

Schwencke died on 9 September 1957, in Hagenow, East Germany (now part of Mecklenburg-Vorpommern, Germany).
