= Walter Granzow =

German estate manager and Nazi Party politician

Minister-president and Foreign Minister Mecklenburg-Schwerin
- In office 13 July 1932 – 9 August 1933
- Preceded by: Karl Eschenburg
- Succeeded by: Hans Egon Engell

Minister of Agriculture and Minister of Finance Mecklenburg-Schwerin
- In office 13 July 1932 – 5 July 1933
- Preceded by: Karl Eschenburg (Agriculture); Hermann Haack (Finance)
- Succeeded by: Hans Egon Engell (Agriculture); Friedrich Scharf (Finance)

Minister of Education Mecklenburg-Schwerin
- In office 5 July 1933 – 9 August 1933
- Preceded by: Friedrich Scharf
- Succeeded by: Hans Egon Engell

Personal details
- Born: 13 August 1887 Pritzwalk, Province of Brandenburg, Kingdom of Prussia, German Empire
- Died: 3 December 1952 (aged 65) Bad Schwartau, Schleswig-Holstein, West Germany
- Party: Nazi Party
- Profession: Estate manager; Bank executive

Military service
- Allegiance: German Empire; Nazi Germany
- Branch/service: Imperial German Army; Schutzstaffel (SS)
- Years of service: 1914–1918; 1933–1945
- Rank: Oberleutnant; SS-Brigadeführer
- Unit: 4th (Magdeburg) Foot Artillery Regiment
- Awards: Iron Cross, 2nd class

Walter Granzow (13 August 1887 – 3 December 1952) was a German landowner, bank official, Nazi Party politician and SS-Brigadeführer. He served as the Minister-president of the Free State of Mecklenburg-Schwerin from 1932 to 1933. He was also the president and chairman of the board of several large German banks, and the great-grandfather of former German Vice Chancellor Robert Habeck.

== Early life ==
Granzow was born the son of a farmer in the Schönhagen district of the town of Pritzwalk. After attending the Volksschule there and the higher agricultural school in Dahme, he underwent further training at the agricultural institute of the Martin Luther University Halle-Wittenberg. He then worked in agriculture, taking over the management of his parents' estate in Geestgottberg in 1910. Between 1914 and 1918 he fought with the 4th (Magdeburg) Foot Artillery Regiment of the Imperial German Army in the First World War. He was awarded the Iron Cross, 2nd class and was discharged with the rank of Oberleutnant of reserves at the end of the war.

== Agricultural and business career ==
Granzow was a supporter the Artaman League, an agrarian and völkisch movement that was active in the Weimar Republic. During these years, he worked as the Deichhauptmann (lit. 'dike captain') for a cooperative dike association from 1919 to 1922 and then as an estate manager in Severin from 1922 to 1932. Granzow was also a council member on the Kreistag (transl. district council) in the Osterburg district of the Prussian Province of Saxony. On 1 November 1933, he became president of the Deutsche Rentenbank-Kreditanstalt (RKA), based in Berlin. He subsequently served as chairman of the supervisory board of various Berlin banks, including RKA, Deutsche Pachtbank and Getreide-Kreditbank. He was also chairman of the management board of the Deutsche Siedlungsbank (lit. 'German Settlement Bank').

== Nazi Party political and paramilitary involvement ==
Granzow joined the Nazi Party on 1 March 1931 (membership number 482,923) and was its agricultural district advisor for Mecklenburg and Lübeck from 1931 to 1933. He was also the Landesbauernführer (state farmers leader) for these areas. In the June 1932 state election, he was elected to the provincial Landtag of Mecklenburg-Schwerin. The Nazi Party won a majority of the seats, and Granzow became the minister president and foreign minister of the state of Mecklenburg-Schwerin from 13 July 1932 to 9 August 1933. In addition, from 13 July 1932 to 5 July 1933 he held the ministries of finance and agriculture, and from 5 July to 9 August 1933 he held the portfolio of minister of education. In October 1933, he became a member of Hans Frank's Academy for German Law in Munich and chairman of its Committee on Cooperative Law. From 1933 to 1943, Granzow sat as a member of the Reichstag. From November 1933, he was a deputy from electoral constituency 35 (Mecklenburg) and, from March 1936, he represented constituency 10 (Magdeburg). From 1935, he also worked closely with Reichsminister of Agriculture Richard Walther Darré in the Party's Office of Agricultural Policy.

On 2 October 1933, Granzow joined the SS (SS number 128,801) as an SS-Sturmbannführer. He worked in the SS Race and Settlement Main Office, was promoted to SS-Obersturmbannführer on 20 April 1934 and to SS-Standartenführer on 9 September 1934. He served on the staff of Reichsführer-SS Heinrich Himmler and received his final promotion to SS-Brigadeführer on 9 November 1936.

After the end of the Second World War, Granzow was arrested and interned from 1945 to 1948. After his release, he worked as an economic consultant and as a representative for a margarine factory in Holstein. He died in Bad Schwartau in December 1952.

== Sources ==
- Bronder, Dietrich (1975). Bevor Hitler kam: Eine historische Studie (2 ed.). Berlin: Marva. ISBN 978-3-858-00002-6.
- Das Deutsche Führerlexikon 1934-1935. Berlin: Verlagsanftalt Otto Stollberg G. m. b. H. 1934.
- Walter Granzow entry in the Acts of the Reich Chancellery (Weimar Republic)
- Walter Granzow biography in the Reichstag Database
- Klee, Ernst (2007). Das Personenlexikon zum Dritten Reich. Wer war was vor und nach 1945. Frankfurt-am-Main: Fischer-Taschenbuch-Verlag. ISBN 978-3-596-16048-8.
- Schiffer Publishing Ltd., ed. (2000). SS Officers List: SS-Standartenführer to SS-Oberstgruppenführer (As of 30 January 1942). Schiffer Military History Publishing. ISBN 0-7643-1061-5.
- Stockhorst, Erich (1985). 5000 Köpfe: Wer War Was im 3. Reich. Arndt. ISBN 978-3-887-41116-9.
