= Bloody Week (disambiguation) =

Bloody Week may refer to:

- Semaine sanglante, a weeklong battle at the end of the 1871 Paris Commune
- Sanglante semaine (Lyon), the suppression of the Second Canut revolt in Lyon, France, in 1834
- Berliner Blutwoche, the suppression of a strike in Berlin in March 1919
- Bloody Week (Argentina), a series of riots and massacres in Buenos Aires, Argentina, in January 1919
- Bloody Week (Germany), the suppression of Berlin's Spartacist uprising in January 1919
- Köpenick's week of bloodshed, a week of arrests, torture, and killings by the German Sturmabteilung in June 1933
