= Gau Mecklenburg =

Administrative division of Nazi Germany from 1933 to 1945

- Gau of Nazi Germany
- 1925–1945
- Flag Coat of arms

- Capital: Schwerin
- Government
- Gauleiter
  - 1925–1930: Friedrich Hildebrandt
  - 1930–1931: Herbert Albrecht
  - 1931–1945: Friedrich Hildebrandt
- History
  - Establishment: 22 March 1925
  - Disestablishment: 8 May 1945
Preceded by	Succeeded by
Free State of Mecklenburg-Schwerin; Free State of Mecklenburg-Strelitz	State of Mecklenburg-Vorpommern
- Today part of: Germany

The Gau Mecklenburg, was formed as Gau Mecklenburg-Lübeck on 22 March 1925 and renamed Gau Mecklenburg on 31 March 1937 when Lübeck was transferred to Gau Schleswig-Holstein. It was an administrative division of Nazi Germany from 1933 to 1945 in the Free State of Mecklenburg-Strelitz and the Free State of Mecklenburg-Schwerin. Before that, from 1925 to 1933, it was the regional subdivision of the Nazi Party in that area.

== History ==
The Nazi Gau (plural Gaue) system was originally established in a party conference on 22 May 1926, in order to improve administration of the party structure. From 1933 onwards, after the Nazi seizure of power, the Gaue increasingly replaced the German states as administrative subdivisions in Germany.

At the head of each Gau stood a Gauleiter, a position which became increasingly more powerful, especially after the outbreak of the Second World War, with little interference from above. Local Gauleiters often held government positions as well as party ones and were in charge of, among other things, propaganda and surveillance and, from September 1944 onward, the Volkssturm and the defense of the Gau.

The position of Gauleiter in Mecklenburg was held by Friedrich Hildebrandt for the duration of the existence of the Gau, interrupted only by an eight-month suspension from July 1930 to February 1931 when he was briefly succeeded by Herbert Albrecht. Hildebrandt was sentenced to death by a military tribunal and executed for war crimes in 1948.
