= Herbert Albrecht =

Nazi-German politician (1900–1945)

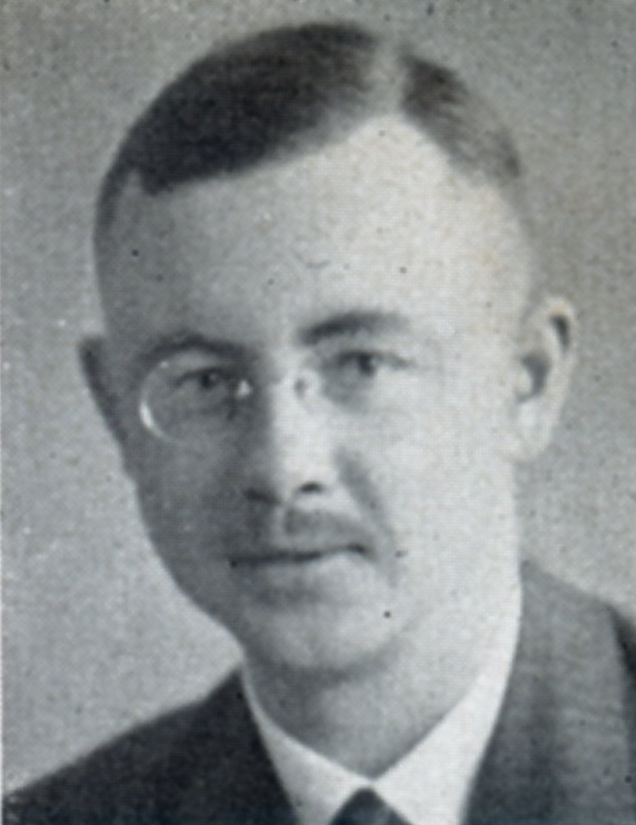
- Albrecht in 1933

Acting Gauleiter of Gau Mecklenburg-Lübeck
- In office July 1930 – 31 January 1931
- Preceded by: Friedrich Hildebrandt
- Succeeded by: Friedrich Hildebrandt

Personal details
- Born: 12 January 1900 Altenburg, Saxe-Altenburg, German Empire
- Died: 13 June 1945 (aged 45) Munich, Bavaria, American-occupied Germany
- Party: National Socialist German Workers Party (NSDAP)
- Other political affiliations: German Social Party
- Occupation: Agricultural Specialist

Military service
- Allegiance: German Empire; Weimar Republic
- Branch/service: Imperial German Army; Reichsheer
- Years of service: 1918–1919
- Rank: Fahnenjunker-Gefreiter
- Unit: Anhalt Infantry Regiment 93; Infantry Regiment 49

Herbert Albrecht (12 January 1900 – 13 June 1945) was the Nazi Party Gauleiter of Gau Mecklenburg-Lubeck from 1930 to 1931. He was also a long-serving member of the Reichstag from 1930 to 1945.

== Early life ==
Albrecht was born in Altenburg, on 12 January 1900. He completed the Realgymnasium in 1918. Afterwards, he volunteered for the German Army and joined Anhalt Infantry Regiment 93 as a Fahnenjunker (officer candidate). After the First World War, in 1919 he passed his final high school examination in Halle and became a member of the Freikorps in Halle and in Anhalt.

In September 1919, Albrecht was discharged from Reichswehr Infantry Regiment 49 with the rank of Fahnenjunker-Gefreiter. That year he also joined the antisemitic organisations Reichshammerbund (founded by the German author Theodor Fritsch) and Deutschvölkischer Schutz- und Trutzbund. In 1920, Albrecht helped to organize the German Social Party in Berlin. Between 1919 and 1925, Albrecht was an agricultural worker, apprentice, and a civil servant in Holstein, Lübeck and East Prussia. He also studied economics and agriculture at the University of Berlin, University of Rostock and University of Giessen. In 1925, he received his doctorate in agriculture and, in 1926–27, he volunteered as an agricultural administrator in Vogtland.

== Nazi Party career ==
As a member of the Sturmabteilung (SA) between 1923 and 1925, Albrecht was successively Gruppenführer (group leader), Zugführer (platoon leader) and Fahnenträger (standard bearer) in the Nationsozialistische Hundertschaft Charlottenburg (later SA-Sturm 38, "Maikowski"). From 1924 he was a contributor to the National-Socialist newspaper Völkischer Beobachter. On 11 May 1926, Albrecht formally joined the Nazi Party (membership number 35,916) and stood as a candidate for the Landtag in the Province of Saxony. In 1927 he was appointed as a Reich-level orator (Reichsredner) and a financial adviser for the Party. From 1927 to 1933, he served in the Party’s Reichsleitung (National Leadership) at the Brown House in Munich. From November 1931 to September 1932, he served as a member of the Party’s Reich Economic Council, and from December 1932 to 1933 he sat on the Party’s Economic Policy Commission.

In July 1930, Albrecht was appointed as acting Gauleiter of Gau Mecklenburg-Lübeck when the incumbent Gauleiter, Friedrich Hildebrandt, was placed on a leave of absence. However Albrecht's tenure was brief, as on 31 January 1931 Hildebrandt was reinstated. In September 1930, Albrecht had been elected a member of the Reichstag from electoral constituency 12, Thuringia. From 1931 to 1933 Albrecht was the chairman of the Nazi faction in the Reichstag economics committee and deputy chairman of the Nazi faction in the budget committee. In March 1933 he became the first deputy chairman of the budget committee.

On 20 July 1933, Albrecht was named Thuringia's deputy plenipotentiary to the Reichsrat, a post he held until its abolition on 14 February 1934. Also in 1933, he was named Special Representative in Berlin of the Thüringian State Government. In December 1933, Albrecht became a Reichstag secretary and a member of its executive committee. He would continue in these posts until the end of the Nazi regime in May 1945. At the March 1936 Reichstag election, he was elected from electoral constituency 28, (Dresden–Bautzen) and would retain that seat until 1945.

From 1934 to 1936 Albrecht served on the board of directors of the Reich Postal Service and as a member of the Small and Large Labor Conventions of the Deutsche Arbeitsfront (German Labor Front). He also a member and, until 1941, chairman of the German Auditing and Trust Company in Berlin, and sat on the board of directors of the Berlin Power and Light Company.

== Sources ==
- Höffkes, Karl (1986). Hitlers Politische Generale. Die Gauleiter des Dritten Reiches: ein biographisches Nachschlagewerk. Tübingen: Grabert-Verlag. ISBN 3-87847-163-7.
- Miller, Michael D.; Schulz, Andreas (2012). Gauleiter: The Regional Leaders of the Nazi Party and Their Deputies, 1925-1945. Vol. I (Herbert Albrecht – H. Wilhelm Hüttmann). R. James Bender Publishing. ISBN 978-1-932970-21-0.
