= Fritz Dallmann =

East German politician (1923–1999)

Chairman of the Peasants Mutual Aid Association
- In office 1982–1990
- Preceded by: Fritz Zeuner
- Succeeded by: Karl Dämmrich

Member of the Volkskammer
- In office 1986–1990

Personal details
- Born: Fritz Karl Dallmann; June 17, 1923 Wysoka, Pomeranian Voivodeship, Poland
- Died: May 4, 1999 (aged 75) Priborn, Mecklenburg-Vorpommern, Germany
- Party: Party of Democratic Socialism (1989–); Socialist Unity Party (1947–1989)
- Other political affiliations: Peasants Mutual Aid Association
- Education: University of Rostock
- Occupation: Politician
- Awards: Patriotic Order of Merit, in gold (1983); Order of Karl Marx (1970); Hero of Labour (1959)
- Military Service
- Allegiance: Nazi Germany
- Branch: Kriegsmarine
- Service years: 1941-1945
- Conflicts: Second World War (POW)

Fritz Dallmann (17 June 1923 – 4 May 1999) was an East German politician who served as Chairman of the Peasants Mutual Aid Association from 1982 until German reunification in 1990.

Dallmann's political career began after World War II, and he joined the SED and VdgB in 1947. He quickly became known for initiating agricultural programs throughout the GDR, and was awarded the Hero of Labour of East Germany in 1959.

From 1986 until reunification, Dallmann was a member of the Volkskammer.

Political offices
Preceded by Fritz Zeuner	Chairman of the Peasants Mutual Aid Association; 1982–1990	Succeeded by Karl Dämmrich
