= Herbert Gehrke =

German SA commander

- Born: Herbert Ottokar Gehrke; 12 June 1910; Lichtenberg, Berlin, Germany
- Died: 18 March 1945 (aged 34); Luxembourg
- Cause of death: Killed in action
- Occupations: SA Commander; Nazi activist
- Known for: Köpenick's week of bloodshed
- Political party: Nazi Party

Herbert Gehrke (12 June 1910 – 18 March 1945) was a German SA commander.

He is remembered, in particular, as the organiser of Köpenick's week of bloodshed which took place in June 1933 and subsequently came to be seen as an early harbinger of the Shoah. He was implicated in the killing of Johannes Stelling.

== Life ==
Herbert Ottokar Gehrke was born in Lichtenberg, a suburb of Berlin on the city's eastern side. His father was a telegraph worker who later became a local councillor at Köpenick, a short distance to the south. The boy attended junior school locally and a single-sex middle school at Neukölln nearby. He moved on to the Friedrich-Werdersche Senior School, but had to leave after a year in order to embark on an apprenticeship as a brick-layer. He managed to pass his School final exams (Abitur) three years later. At the same time he successfully qualified as a brick-layer while working on the construction of a police accommodation block in Köpenick. Over the next few years he worked as a freelance brick-layer, but his employment was punctuated by periods of unemployment and he also took other forms of building work, worked for the postal service and undertook factory work.

Gehrke joined the Hitler Youth organisation in 1927, and in July 1928 he joined the Nazi Party. He performed various political leadership roles within the party locally, also serving at one stage as treasurer and as deputy section leader for Köpenick. At the start of 1929 he also joined the Sturmabteilung (SA) which operated as the Nazi Party's quasi-military wing. He was assigned to the SA's "Troop 37". In October 1930 he was promoted to the rank of " Scharführer" ("squadron leader"), and early in 1931 he was promoted again, becoming leader of the SA Troop in Köpenick. During this period he developed a close personal bond with Wilhelm Sander, at this time a leader within the SA (though Sander would be purged and murdered in 1934).

Early in 1931 the so-called Stennes Revolt represented a violent split within the (SA). Sander secured control over the local SA head office ("Gauhaus") with his SA people, and Gehrke was given leadership of SA "Storm Troop 37". In December 1931 this Storm Troop was uprated, becoming the "Standard 55" troop. Gehrke retained leadership of it.

Rapid increases in membership accompanied the Nazi rise to power and the party's successful power grab at the start of 1933, and this triggered a succession of organisational changes to the structure and hierarchy of the SA. Early in 1933 Gehrke's group was upgraded again, becoming an autonomous SA unit ("Sturmbann"), finally promoted again on 6 August 1933 to Standarte 15. By this time Gehrke and his unit had acquired notoriety for their savage rounding up of left-wing extremists. An exercise later known as Köpenick's week of bloodshed (die "Köpenicker Blutwoche") had taken place in June 1933, and involved known political opponents of the Nazi government. Raids on people's homes had included not merely searches for weapons, but also approximately 500 arrests. Some of the detainees were tortured and at least 23 died. It was only much later, after the fall of the Nazi regime, that the events of that week could be presented to a court of law, at which point it was confirmed that the killings had constituted murders. Victims included the Social Democratic former minister president of Mecklenburg-Schwerin, Johannes Stelling and Anton Schmau who died later from gunshot wounds. The shots were thought to have been fired by Gehrke himself. Directly after the events, however, in July 1933 Gehrke was promoted to the rank of SA-Obersturmbannführer ("Senior SA unit leader") in recognition of his contribution to implementing the [Nazi] national revolution" ("in Anerkennung seiner Verdienste um die Durchführung der nationalen Revolution"). In February 1934 another promotion followed for Gehrke, this time to the rank of SA-Standartenführer. This put him in charge of around 3,000 SA men in the Köpenick district. He continued to lead Standarte 15 until 30 April 1935 after which, on 1 May 1935, he became an SA leader, allocated the SA Brigades 28 and 29. He retained these responsibilities until 31 July 1939.

Outside the Nazi paramilitary world, in 1933 Gehrke became deputy chairman of the Köpenick office of the local health insurance ("Ortskrankenkasse") provider.

After 1941, Gehrke took part in World War II as a soldier. By 1945 he had reached the rank of Oberleutnant. Shortly before the war ended he was killed in battle. He is buried in a military cemetery in Sandweiler in the south-eastern part of Luxembourg.

== Justice in East Berlin ==
The end of the war in May 1945 was accompanied by the collapse of the Nazi regime. A large part of what remained of Germany, including East Berlin, now fell under Soviet administration: official interest in the "Köpenicker Blutwoche" resurfaced. Between 19 and 21 June 1947 four SA men found themselves charged with crimes against humanity in connection with the events in Köpenick fourteen years earlier. Two of these were found guilty and sentenced to terms of respectively eight years and eighteen months: the third was acquitted and the fourth managed to escape before the trial. Two more were tried, convicted and sentenced to short prison terms in August 1948.

It was not until after the Soviet occupation zone had given way to the German Democratic Republic that a larger number of those allegedly complicit in the massacre faced trial. Between 5 June and 19 July 1950, a trial of 61 formally identified defendants took place in the Fourth Criminal Chamber at the District Court in East Berlin. Only 32 of the 61 indicted were actually present, and the remaining 29 were tried in absentia. 47 of the 61 were identified as SA men, three were identified as Nazi Party members and one as an SS man. For the remaining ten, no equivalent affiliation was recorded. Of those tried in absentia, the whereabouts of thirteen was unknown, while another ten were in West Germany, which since 1949 had been separated from East Germany politically and, increasingly, physically. Three others of the accused managed to escape before the trial and one was known to have died young. Those who had escaped to West Germany never faced trial.

Most or all of those tried were found guilty. Fifteen were sentenced to death and a further thirteen received life sentences. Twenty-five received prison sentences of between ten and twenty-five years and four others were sentenced to five years each of forced labour.
