= Johannes Stelling =

German political activist (1877-1933)

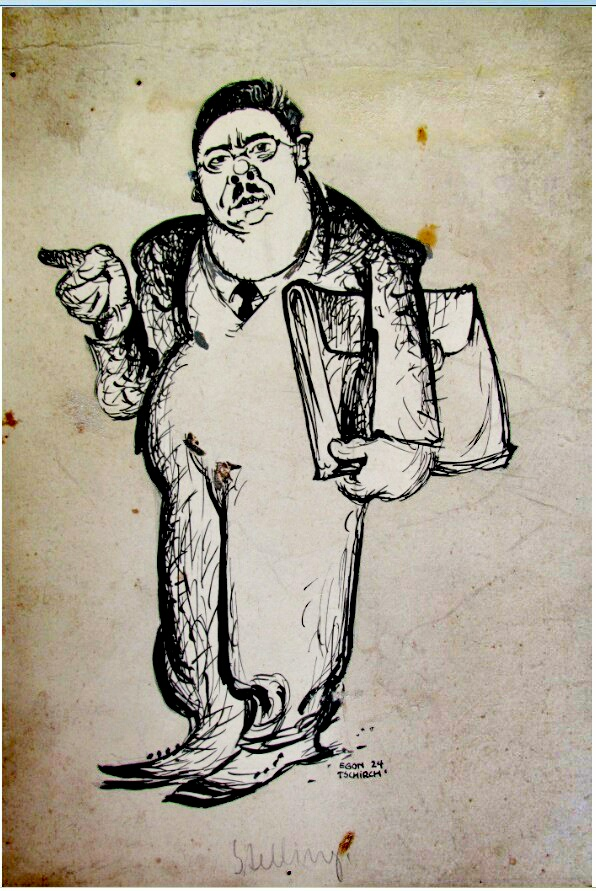
- Cartoon Johannes Stelling, prime minister Mecklenburg-Schwerin (1924).
- Born: 12 May 1877; Hamburg, Germany
- Died: 21/22 June 1933 (aged 56); Köpenick, Berlin, Germany
- Occupations: Union activist Politician
- Political party: SPD (1905-1933)
- Spouse: Frieda Jandrine Amalie Schilling

Johannes Stelling (12 May 1877 – 21/22 June 1933) was a German political activist who became a leading SPD politician during the Weimar years. He served between 1921 and 1924 as First Minister (Ministerpräsident) of Mecklenburg-Schwerin.

Johannes Stelling was murdered by Nazi quasi-militaries on 21/22 June 1933.

== Life ==
=== Provenance and early years ===
Stelling was born in the dynamic port city of Hamburg. His father worked as a tailor: his mother worked as a cook. He attended school locally before undertaking a commercial apprenticeship in 1892, completing it successfully in 1895. On completion of his training he entered the work force, working for a few years in the trade for which he had trained, later becoming involved in various strikes called in support of higher wages and shorter working hours, and becoming caught up in the feverish industrial relations atmosphere which had become a feature of Hamburg at the turn of the century following several decades of rapid economic growth and urban expansion. In 1901, which was also the year of his marriage and the year in which he joined the Social Democratic party, he relocated to Lübeck, a short distance to the east. By this time his political awareness had been fully awakened: between 1901 and 1919 Johannes Stelling worked as the editor of the Lübecker Volksbote, a Social Democrat daily newspaper serving Lübeck and the surrounding area. His period as editor was a long one, and according to the biographical note on Stelling that appears, alongside those of other members, in the "Reichstag Handbooks" of subsequent decades, he was imprisoned several times during these years.

=== City politics ===
In 1905 the first four Social Democrats were elected to the city council of Lübeck. One of them was Johannes Stelling. Slightly more than two years later, in the municipal election of November 1907, the number of votes for Stelling in the city's "Electoral district II" had increased from 595 to 714, and the Lübecker Volksbote was able to report to its readers an encouraging growth ("... einen erfreulichen Zuwachs") in the party's result. For the next few years Stelling struggled to promote the interests of his supporters as a city councillor, while leaving no one in any doubt about his commitment to peace during a period characterised by rising military expenditure in Germany, Russia and Britain. Nevertheless, when, in July 1914, war broke out, like most party members, Stelling and the newspaper he edited followed the party line, which effectively meant postponing class struggle in order to focus on winning the war.

"Back in 1905, when the first four SPD members entered the city council, almost no one would have thought that in just a decade and a half the SPD group in [Lübeck] council would constitute a majority. What is more, no one then would have believed that women would by now be represented"

Johannes Stelling addressing the eighth session of the Lübeck city council
(17 March 1919)

From 1916 Stelling belonged to Lübeck's "Kriegshilfe" and "Landesversorgungsamt", created to provide welfare support to war victims. In 1917, when the SPD split over the issue of continuing support for the war, he remained steadfast in his support for the mainstream party, while anti-war party colleagues broke away to form the Independent Social Democratic Party of Germany (which after the war would form the basis for the creation of the German Communist Party). The end of the war was followed by a plethora of political uprisings in Germany. This led to a constitutional revolution defined partly by the demands of German insurgents and partly by the requirements of the French, British and US politicians represented at the post war peace conference. Through the instability and desperate austerity of 1919 Stelling used his position on the city council and his role as a newspaper editor to campaigned energetically against war and in favour of revolutionary democratic changes. He was loud in his support of the soldiers' and workers' councils that sprang up, and the Lübecker Volksbote was naturally unstinting in its backing for him.

=== National politics ===
Revolutionary democratic changes had been adumbrated in November 1918 when the Kaiser abdicated and moved to a small town near Utrecht in the Netherlands. Three months later, in February 1919, an assembly was convened at Weimar in central southern Germany, mandated to draft a post-imperial constitution. Delegates were elected using proportional representation. Women were allowed to vote. In terms of support, the SPD in Lübeck had come a long way since 1905, and was now the largest party on the city council. Johannes Stelling, already a leading figure in city politics, was now elected as a member of the constitutional assembly meeting in Weimar.

The Weimar assembly turned out to be the precursor to the Reichstag of the new German republic. Stelling was elected a member in the June 1920 general election and continued to be re-elected thereafter, sitting continuously as an SPD Reichstag member until 1933, apart from a seven-month absence between May and December 1924.

=== Regional politics ===
During the early 1920s Stelling was also prominent in the regional politics of Mecklenburg-Schwerin, the region directly to the east of Lübeck. The new republican arrangements provided for a Mecklenburg-Schwerin regional legislative assembly ("Landtag des Freistaates Mecklenburg-Schwerin"). Johannes Stelling combined his membership of the German Reichstag in Berlin with a seat in the regional assembly at Schwerin between 1920 and 1924. His party, the SPD, held more than 40% of the seats in the chamber during this period and accordingly dominated the regional government. Between 1919/1920 and 1921 Stelling served as he regional Interior Minister, and then between 19 January 1921 and 18 March 1924 he served as First Minister (Ministerpräsident) of Mecklenburg-Schwerin. In the regional elections of February 1924 there was a major swing against the SPD, which was consistent with national trends as the SPD government was blamed for the Hyperinflation crisis: after February 1924 Stelling was no longer a member of the Mecklenburg-Schwerin Landtag.

=== Party role ===
In 1924 Johannes Stelling became a member of the SPD leadership team, initially as Party Secretary. He also became a leading member, on behalf of the SPD, of the Black-red-gold national flag organisation, established by the major moderate political parties to oppose anti-democratic extremism. By the later 1920s the Stelling family had relocated, like many upwardly mobile working-class families, to one of the fashionable houses in the new residential developments behind the railway station in the rapidly expanding Berlin quarter of Köpenick.

=== Régime change and murder ===
The political backdrop changed dramatically early in 1933 when the Nazi party took power and lost little time in imposing one-party dictatorship on Germany. By May 1933 many SPD leaders had moved to Prague where they set up a SPD leadership structure in exile. Stelling was urged to accompany the others, but preferred to remain in Germany and serve as a link man between the party leadership in Prague and the party membership left behind in Nazi Germany.

"There were about 12 SA people guarding us who forced us into a vehicle. We were driven to Dahlwitzer Square, where we all had to get out and wait with our arms folded behind our heads, till a city bus turned up, which took us to the Seidler [restaurant] in Uhlenhorst. We were hustled through the garden into the main room, and there we were beaten. When I was asked how many years I had been in the SPD I answered "29 or 30": I was beaten 30 times, after my pants had been dragged off me. We were beaten with half branches, not just with willow canes. I was semi-conscious, but I saw that my son was being treated the same way. I then had to sit at the side and saw Gretchen Schmau, then about 12, who was sitting opposite me, being vilely insulted by the SA people. There were between 150 and 200 people in the room. They were taking turns with the beating.'

'I also saw how Mr. Stelling was brought in. He came into the room separately. I knew him already from Hamburg, and I knew that he had been the Ministerpräsident in Schwerin. His pants were also pulled down and he was beaten like the others. He was then taken to one side and kept separate. Towards dawn, as it was getting light, we were taken to the jail."

Heinrich Reinefeld
witness statement, 1950

Stelling was prominent and uncompromising in opposing political extremism, and did not hesitate to give voice at home and internationally to the burgeoning suspicion that Reichstag fire, cited by the Hitler government as a justification for their suspension of democracy, had somehow been triggered by the Nazi government itself. The suggestion enraged the Nazis. Overnight on 21/22 June, under orders from a commander in the Nazi Party's military wing called Herbert Gehrke, Johannes Stelling was arrested, along with several other who shared his political views. One fellow party member arrested at the same time, along with his son, was Heinrich Reinefeld, a lawyer who was an eye witness to some of what happened next, and who survived to give his account of it. Stelling was one of a group of detainees taken to an ad hoc detention centre in the Gaststätte Seidler ("Seidler restaurant") in the nearby Uhlenhorstin district. Here they were assaulted and tortured by more than 150 SA members.

Ten days later, on 10 July, a large bag weighted down with stones was pulled out of the Dahme (river). Along with the stones it contained the body of a man, distorted by multiple gunshot wounds to its upper torso. The body could not be identified, but a wedding ring and the initials sewn onto the accompanying handkerchief revealed it to be the body of Johannes Stelling, and it was handed over to his relatives for disposal.

The burial took place on 24 August 1933 at the Friedrichsfelde Cemetery. On 4 December 1950 the grave was repositioned and integrated into the Socialists' Memorial Area in the same cemetery, which in the intervening seventeen years had become the most prestigious cemetery in East Berlin, itself by this time the capital of a new one-party dictatorship.

Stelling's murder has come to be recognised as part of a larger action in the Berlin quarter of Köpenick, and to be identified as the Köpenicker Blutwoche ("Köpenick's week of bloodshed"). In the Berlin region it gained a certain notoriety early on, which the Nazis were content to encourage as a warning that opposition to the new régime should be avoided. Fifteen years later the Soviet administration in the Soviet occupation zone, and their successors after 1949 in charge of the Soviet sponsored German Democratic Republic (East Germany), were keen to play up atrocities committed by the Nazi regime. In both cases, the "Köpenicker Blutwoche" may not have been the greatest of the Nazi atrocities, but it was one of the first on such a scale, and it has attracted the attention of later writers because of this. Johannes Stelling and the businessman Georg Eppenstein were probably its most prominent victims.
