= Fritz Zeuner =

East German politician (1921–1982)

Chairman of the Peasants Mutual Aid Association
- In office 1979–1982
- Preceded by: Ernst Wulf
- Succeeded by: Fritz Dallmann

Personal details
- Born: 30 January 1921 Dölzig, Altenburger Land, Thuringia, Weimar Republic
- Died: 20 April 1982 (age 61) East Berlin, German Democratic Republic
- Party: Socialist Unity Party of Germany (1946-); Communist Party of Germany (1945-1946)
- Other political affiliations: Peasants Mutual Aid Association (VdgB)
- Education: University of Leipzig; Parteihochschule Karl Marx
- Occupation: Politician
- Awards: Patriotic Order of Merit, in Silver (1981); Patriotic Order of Merit, in Bronze (1975)

Military service
- Allegiance: Nazi Germany
- Branch/service: Wehrmacht
- Years of service: 1940-1945
- Battles/wars: World War Two

Fritz Zeuner (1921-1982) was an East German politician, who was Chairman of the Peasants Mutual Aid Association from 1979 to 1982.

He served in the Wehrmacht in World War II, and joined the Communist Party of Germany in 1945. He attended the University of Leipzig, where he studied economics. Zeuner was active in the VdgB from its founding in the late 1940s, and was director of the Academy of Agricultural Sciences in Berlin from 1953 to 1961. In 1979, he became Chairman of the VdgB, and remained at that post until his death in 1982.

Political offices
Preceded by Ernst Wulf	Chairman of the Peasants Mutual Aid Association; 1979–1982	Succeeded by Fritz Dallmann
