= Peasants Mutual Aid Association =

Mass organization in the GDR (German Democratic Republic)

- Vereinigung der gegenseitigen Bauernhilfe

- Formation: 1947
- Dissolved: 1990
- Headquarters: East Berlin
- Location: East Germany
- Members: 632,000 (1989)
- Chairman: Otto Körting (1947–1950); Friedrich Wehmer (1950–1964); Ernst Wulf (1964–1979); Fritz Zeuner (1979–1982); Fritz Dallman (1982–1990); Karl Dämmrich (1990)
- 1986 Volkskammer: 14 / 500

The Peasants Mutual Aid Association (German: Vereinigung der gegenseitigen Bauernhilfe, VdgB) was an East German mass organization for peasants and farmers, later also gardeners. It was founded in the 1945–1946 period and was a participant in the National Front. From 1950 to 1963 and again in 1986, it had representation in the Volkskammer.

In 1989, a GDR publication put the membership of the VdgB at 632,000 persons. During the Peaceful Revolution, the VdgB suffered because of its extensive connections with the ruling Socialist Unity Party. In February 1990, it changed its name to the Farmers Association of the GDR but was unable to make the transition from East German society to that of a reunified Germany. It was fully liquidated in 1994.

From 1979 to 1990, the VdgB operated the Ringberghaus, a large hotel east of the city of Suhl. The hotel's purpose was to provide accommodation for farmers on holiday in the Thuringian Forest, and a VdgB voucher was required for lodging.

== Chairmen of the VdgB ==
Name	Term	Party
Otto Körting	November 1947 – March 1950	SPD, SED
Friedrich Wehmer	March 1950 – February 1964	SED
Ernst Wulf	March 1964 – October 1979	SED
Fritz Zeuner	October 1979 – September 1982	SED
Fritz Dallmann	September 1982 – March 1990	SED
Karl Dämmrich	1990	SPD
