= Free State of Mecklenburg-Strelitz =

German state 1918–1933

Free State of Mecklenburg-Strelitz Freistaat Mecklenburg-Strelitz (German)
- State of the Weimar Republic
- 1918–1933
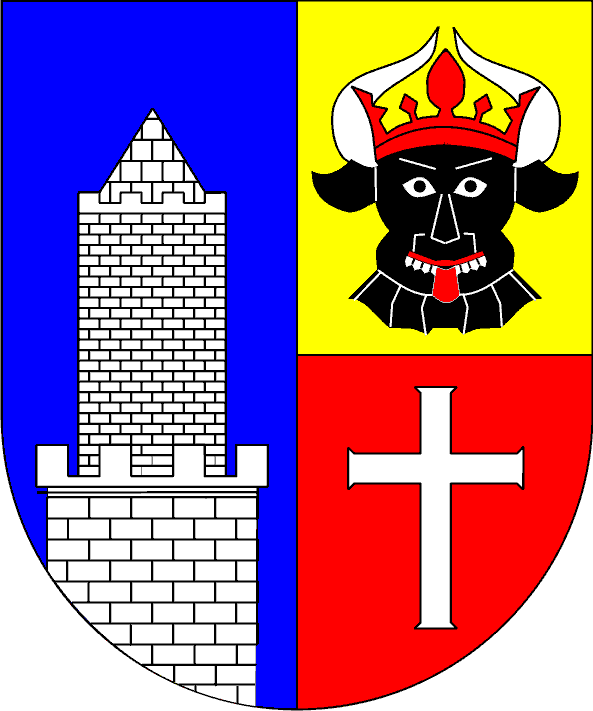
- Flag Coat of arms (1921)

- The Free State of Mecklenburg-Strelitz (red) within the Weimar Republic
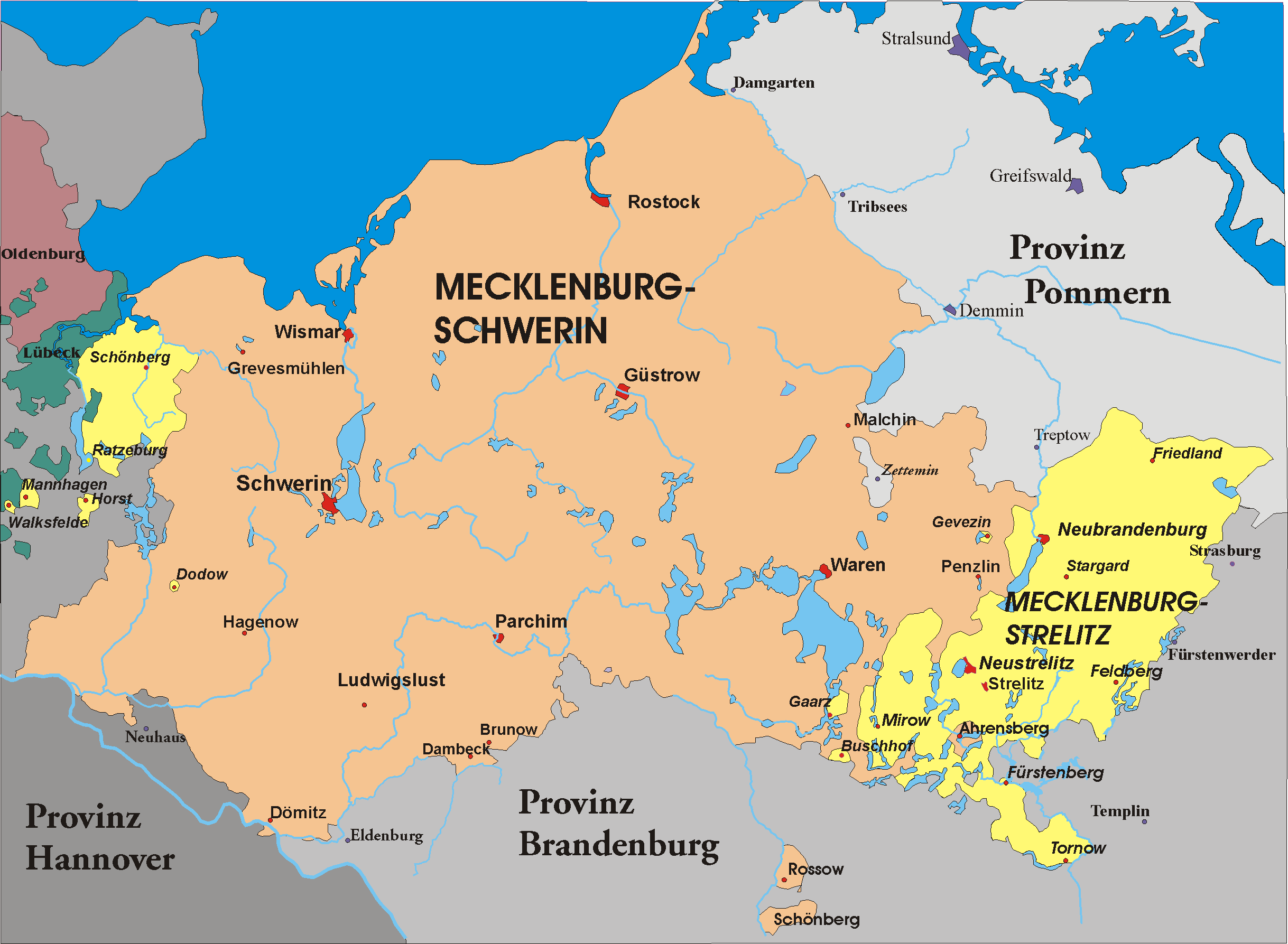
- Mecklenburg-Strelitz, with its two geographically separated sections, is shown in yellow.
- Capital: Neustrelitz
- Area
  - Coordinates: 53°21′53″N 13°03′49″E
  - 1925: 2,930 km^{2} (1,130 sq mi)
- Population
  - 1925: 110,296
  - Type: Republic
- Historical era: Interwar period
  - Established: 11 November 1918
  - Disestablished: 31 December 1933
| Preceded by | Succeeded by |
| Grand Duchy of Mecklenburg-Strelitz | Gau Mecklenburg |
- Today part of: Germany

The Free State of Mecklenburg-Strelitz (German: Freistaat Mecklenburg-Strelitz) was a state of the Weimar Republic. It was established in 1918 following the abdication of Grand Duke Frederick Francis IV of the Grand Duchy of Mecklenburg-Strelitz during the German revolution. The state lasted until the Nazi Party came to power and merged the state with the neighbouring Free State of Mecklenburg-Schwerin to form a united state of Mecklenburg on 1 January 1934. Today it is part of the German states of Mecklenburg-Vorpommern, Brandenburg and Schleswig-Holstein.

== Geography ==
The Free State of Mecklenburg-Strelitz, like the Grand Duchy before it, consisted of two regions separated by the Free State of Mecklenburg-Schwerin. The larger of the two areas was in the southeast and covered 2,550 km^{2} (983 sq mi). It included the Free State's capital, Neustrelitz, and had a population in 1925 of 98,000. Ratzeburg, the smaller region in the northwest, covered 380 km^{2} (148 sq mi) and had a population of 14,700.

== History ==
The German revolution of 1918–1919, which overthrew the German Empire and established the Weimar Republic, began with a sailors' mutiny in Kiel in late October 1918. The sailors rapidly spread the revolt across Germany and on November 9–10 formed a workers' and soldiers' council at Neustrelitz on the model of the one set up at Kiel. On 14 November, Grand Duke Frederick Francis IV, who also ruled over Free State of Mecklenburg-Schwerin, abdicated under the pressure of the events in his two grand duchies and went with his family to Denmark.

An election for a constituent state assembly that was to write a new constitution for Mecklenburg-Strelitz was held on 15 December 1918. The moderate-left Social Democratic Party (SPD) won 21 of 42 seats; the local branch of the German Democratic Party came in second with 18. The assembly ratified the new constitution on 29 January 1919. It had rejected proposals from Mecklenburg-Schwerin for a unification of the two states and kept Mecklenburg-Strelitz independent.

The constitution defined a state parliament (Landtag) consisting of 35 members elected for a term of four years by universal suffrage. The government was headed by a state minister who was elected by the Landtag from among its members. The ministry was responsible to the Landtag, and any member could be removed by a vote of no confidence. For most of the Weimar period, the government was headed by either a Social Democrat or a member of the anti-republican German National People's Party (DNVP).

In 1930, an expert report from the federal government in Berlin questioned whether either Mecklenburg-Strelitz or Mecklenburg-Schwerin could remain economically viable as independent states. On 6 February of that year, Mecklenburg-Strelitz's SPD state minister pleaded to the Landtag for the Free State to become part of the state of Prussia, since it could not handle its financial problems on its own.

The question of a merger was settled after the rise of the Nazi Party. It won nine of 35 seats in the 1932 election to the Landtag and formed a coalition with the DNVP. Following the January 1933 Nazi seizure of power at the national level, the Second Law on the Coordination of the States with the Reich established more direct control over the states by means of the new powerful position of Reichsstatthalter (Reich governor). Friedrich Hildebrandt was installed in the post on 26 May 1933. He immediately moved to take full control of the state apparatus by the appointment of a fellow Nazi, Fritz Stichtenoth, as state minister on 29 May 1933.

At the end of the year, Hildebrandt, who was also Reichsstatthalter of the larger neighboring Free State of Mecklenburg-Schwerin, consolidated the two states into a new united state of Gau Mecklenburg effective 1 January 1934. The brief fifteen-year existence of the Free State of Mecklenburg-Strelitz thus came to an end.

== Leaders of Mecklenburg-Strelitz ==
=== Chairmen of the State Ministry of Mecklenburg-Strelitz, 1918–1919 ===
- Peter Franz Stubmann (DDP) 1918–1919
- Johannes Richard Krüger (SPD) 1919

=== Minister-Presidents of Mecklenburg-Strelitz, 1919–1933 ===
- Kurt von Reibnitz (SPD) 1919–1923
- Karl Schwabe (DNVP) 1923–1928
- [[Karl Gustav Hans Otto Freiherr von Reibnitz|Kurt von Reibnitz]] (SPD) 1928–1931
- Heinrich von Michael (DNVP) 1931–1933
- Fritz Stichtenoth (NSDAP) 1933

=== Reichsstatthalter ===
- Friedrich Hildebrandt 1933

== See also ==
- Mecklenburg-Strelitz Landtag elections in the Weimar Republic
