= Mecklenburg-Strelitz Landtag elections in the Weimar Republic =

German state elections

Landtag elections in the Free State of Mecklenburg-Strelitz (Freistaat Mecklenburg-Strelitz) during the Weimar Republic were held at irregular intervals between 1918 and 1932. Results with regard to the total vote, the percentage of the vote won and the number of seats allocated to each party are presented in the tables below. On 31 March 1933, the sitting Landtag was dissolved by the Nazi-controlled central government and reconstituted to reflect the distribution of seats in the national Reichstag. The Landtag subsequently was formally abolished as a result of the "Law on the Reconstruction of the Reich" of 30 January 1934 which replaced the German federal system with a unitary state.

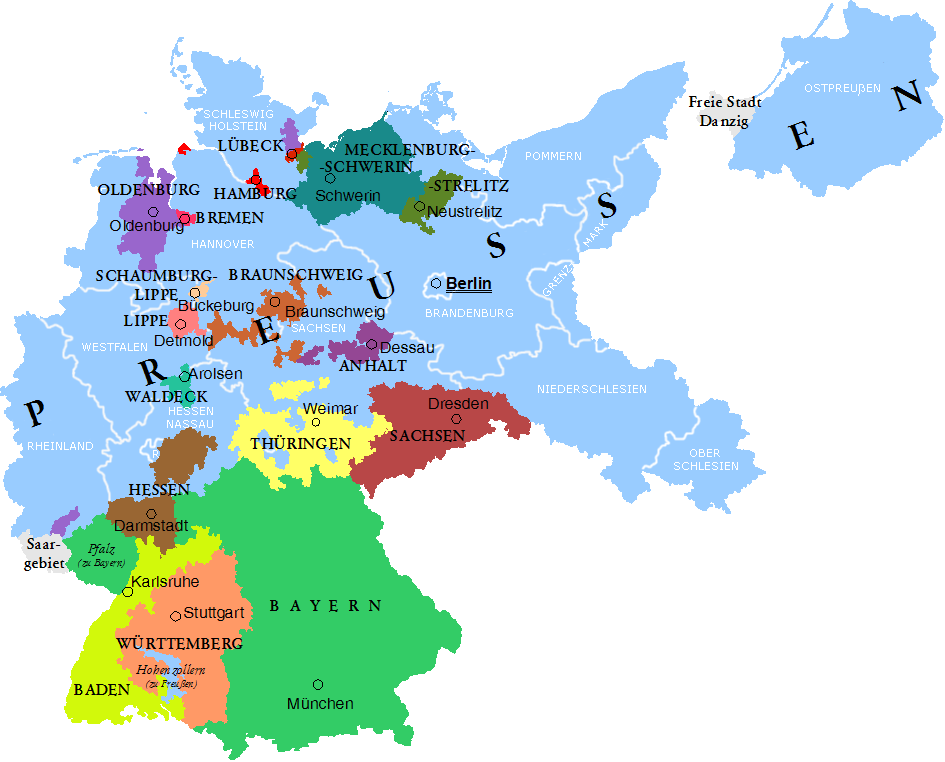
Mecklenburg-Strelitz in the Weimar Republic. At the center and top in dark green.

== 1918 ==
The 1918 Mecklenburg-Strelitz state election was held on 15 December 1918 to elect the 42 members of the constituent assembly.

1918 Mecklenburg-Strelitz state election
| Party | Votes | % | Seats |
|---|---|---|---|
| Social Democratic Party of Germany | 23,745 | 50.22 | 21 |
| German Democratic Party | 18,882 | 39.93 | 18 |
| Mecklenburg-Strelitz Farmers' League | 2,379 | 5.03 | 1 |
| Craftsmen and Tradespeople | 2,280 | 4.82 | 2 |
| Total | 47,286 | 100.00 | 42 |
| Valid votes | 47,286 | 99.64 | |
| Invalid/blank votes | 169 | 0.36 | |
| Total votes | 47,455 | 100.00 | |
Source: Elections in the Weimar Republic, Elections in Germany

== 1919 ==
The 1919 Mecklenburg-Strelitz state election was held on 30 March 1919 to elect the 35 members of the Landtag.

1919 Mecklenburg-Strelitz Landtag election
| Party | Votes | % | Seats | +/– |
|---|---|---|---|---|
| Social Democratic Party of Germany | 23,140 | 48.53 | 18 | –3 |
| Economic Union | 14,511 | 30.44 | 9 | New |
| German Democratic Party | 10,027 | 21.03 | 8 | –10 |
| Total | 47,678 | 100.00 | 35 | –7 |
| Valid votes | 47,678 | 99.53 | | |
| Invalid/blank votes | 224 | 0.47 | | |
| Total votes | 47,902 | 100.00 | | |
Source: Elections in the Weimar Republic, Elections in Germany

== 1920 ==
The 1920 Mecklenburg-Strelitz state election was held on 16 May 1920 to elect the 36 members of the Landtag.

1920 Mecklenburg-Strelitz Landtag election
| Party | Votes | % | Seats | +/– |
|---|---|---|---|---|
| Social Democratic Party of Germany | 23,008 | 42.89 | 16 | –2 |
| Economic Union | 19,368 | 36.11 | 14 | +5 |
| German Democratic Party | 7,875 | 14.68 | 5 | –3 |
| Independent Social Democratic Party of Germany | 2,255 | 4.20 | 1 | New |
| Schott List | 1,137 | 2.12 | 0 | New |
| Total | 53,643 | 100.00 | 36 | +1 |
| Valid votes | 53,643 | 99.57 | | |
| Invalid/blank votes | 233 | 0.43 | | |
| Total votes | 53,876 | 100.00 | | |
| Registered voters/turnout | 62,750 | 85.86 | | |
Source: Elections in the Weimar Republic, Elections in Germany

== 1923 ==
The 1923 Mecklenburg-Strelitz state election was held on 8 July 1923 to elect the 35 members of the Landtag.

1923 Mecklenburg-Strelitz Landtag election
| Party | Votes | % | Seats | +/– |
|---|---|---|---|---|
| German National People's Party | 12,173 | 24.07 | 9 | New |
| Social Democratic Party of Germany | 11,458 | 22.66 | 8 | –8 |
| Communist Party of Germany | 10,342 | 20.45 | 7 | New |
| Civic Working Group [German Democratic Party, Crafts and Trade, merchants] | 7,314 | 14.46 | 5 | New |
| German Völkisch Freedom Party | 4,455 | 8.81 | 3 | New |
| German People's Party | 2,785 | 5.51 | 2 | New |
| Association of Small Farmers | 2,046 | 4.05 | 1 | New |
| Total | 50,573 | 100.00 | 35 | –1 |
| Valid votes | 50,573 | 99.32 | | |
| Invalid/blank votes | 347 | 0.68 | | |
| Total votes | 50,920 | 100.00 | | |
| Registered voters/turnout | 67,044 | 75.95 | | |
Source: Elections in the Weimar Republic, Elections in Germany

== 1927 ==
The 1927 Mecklenburg-Strelitz state election was held on 3 July 1927 to elect the 35 members of the Landtag.

1927 Mecklenburg-Strelitz Landtag election
| Party | Votes | % | Seats | +/– |
|---|---|---|---|---|
| Social Democratic Party of Germany | 15,306 | 33.47 | 12 | +4 |
| German National People's Party | 10,415 | 22.77 | 10 | +1 |
| Association for Craft and Trade | 4,615 | 10.09 | 4 | New |
| Communist Party of Germany | 4,172 | 9.12 | 3 | –4 |
| German Democratic Party | 3,058 | 6.69 | 2 | New |
| German Völkisch Freedom Party | 2,294 | 5.02 | 1 | –2 |
| German People's Party | 2,031 | 4.44 | 1 | –1 |
| Association of Small Farmers | 1,765 | 3.86 | 1 | 0 |
| League of House and Land Owners' Societies | 1,569 | 3.43 | 1 | New |
| Reich Party of the German Middle Class | 509 | 1.11 | 0 | New |
| Total | 45,734 | 100.00 | 35 | 0 |
| Valid votes | 45,734 | 98.87 | | |
| Invalid/blank votes | 521 | 1.13 | | |
| Total votes | 46,255 | 100.00 | | |
Source: Elections in the Weimar Republic, Elections in Germany

== 1928 ==
The 1928 Mecklenburg-Strelitz state election was held on 29 January 1928 to elect the 35 members of the Landtag.

1928 Mecklenburg-Strelitz Landtag election
| Party | Votes | % | Seats | +/– |
|---|---|---|---|---|
| Social Democratic Party of Germany | 19,366 | 37.87 | 13 | +1 |
| German National People's Party | 10,634 | 20.80 | 8 | –2 |
| Association for Craft and Trade | 5,178 | 10.13 | 4 | 0 |
| Communist Party of Germany | 3,572 | 6.99 | 3 | 0 |
| German Democratic Party | 2,369 | 4.63 | 2 | 0 |
| German Völkisch Freedom Party | 1,955 | 3.82 | 1 | 0 |
| Reich Party for Civil Rights and Deflation | 1,891 | 3.70 | 1 | New |
| German People's Party | 1,829 | 3.58 | 1 | 0 |
| League of House and Land Owners' Societies | 1,554 | 3.04 | 1 | 0 |
| United Leaseholders, Small Farmers and Crofters | 1,432 | 2.80 | 1 | New |
| Association of Small Farmers | 667 | 1.30 | 0 | –1 |
| Village Association | 559 | 1.09 | 0 | New |
| German Reform Party | 131 | 0.26 | 0 | New |
| Total | 51,137 | 100.00 | 35 | 0 |
| Valid votes | 51,137 | 99.22 | | |
| Invalid/blank votes | 402 | 0.78 | | |
| Total votes | 51,539 | 100.00 | | |
| Registered voters/turnout | 67,635 | 76.20 | | |
Source: Elections in the Weimar Republic, Elections in Germany

== 1932 ==
The 1932 Mecklenburg-Strelitz state election was held on 13 March 1932 to elect the 35 members of the Landtag.

1932 Mecklenburg-Strelitz Landtag election
| Party | Votes | % | Seats | +/– |
|---|---|---|---|---|
| German National People's Party | 18,472 | 30.96 | 11 | +3 |
| Social Democratic Party of Germany | 16,074 | 26.94 | 10 | –3 |
| Nazi Party | 14,235 | 23.86 | 9 | New |
| Communist Party of Germany | 5,453 | 9.14 | 3 | 0 |
| Civil Center | 3,046 | 5.11 | 1 | New |
| League of House and Land Owners' Societies | 1,589 | 2.66 | 1 | 0 |
| Christian Social People's Service | 796 | 1.33 | 0 | New |
| Total | 59,665 | 100.00 | 35 | 0 |
| Valid votes | 59,665 | 97.43 | | |
| Invalid/blank votes | 1,574 | 2.57 | | |
| Total votes | 61,239 | 100.00 | | |
| Registered voters/turnout | 70,876 | 86.40 | | |
Source: Elections in the Weimar Republic, Elections in Germany
