= Bobbau =

- Stadtteil of Bitterfeld-Wolfen
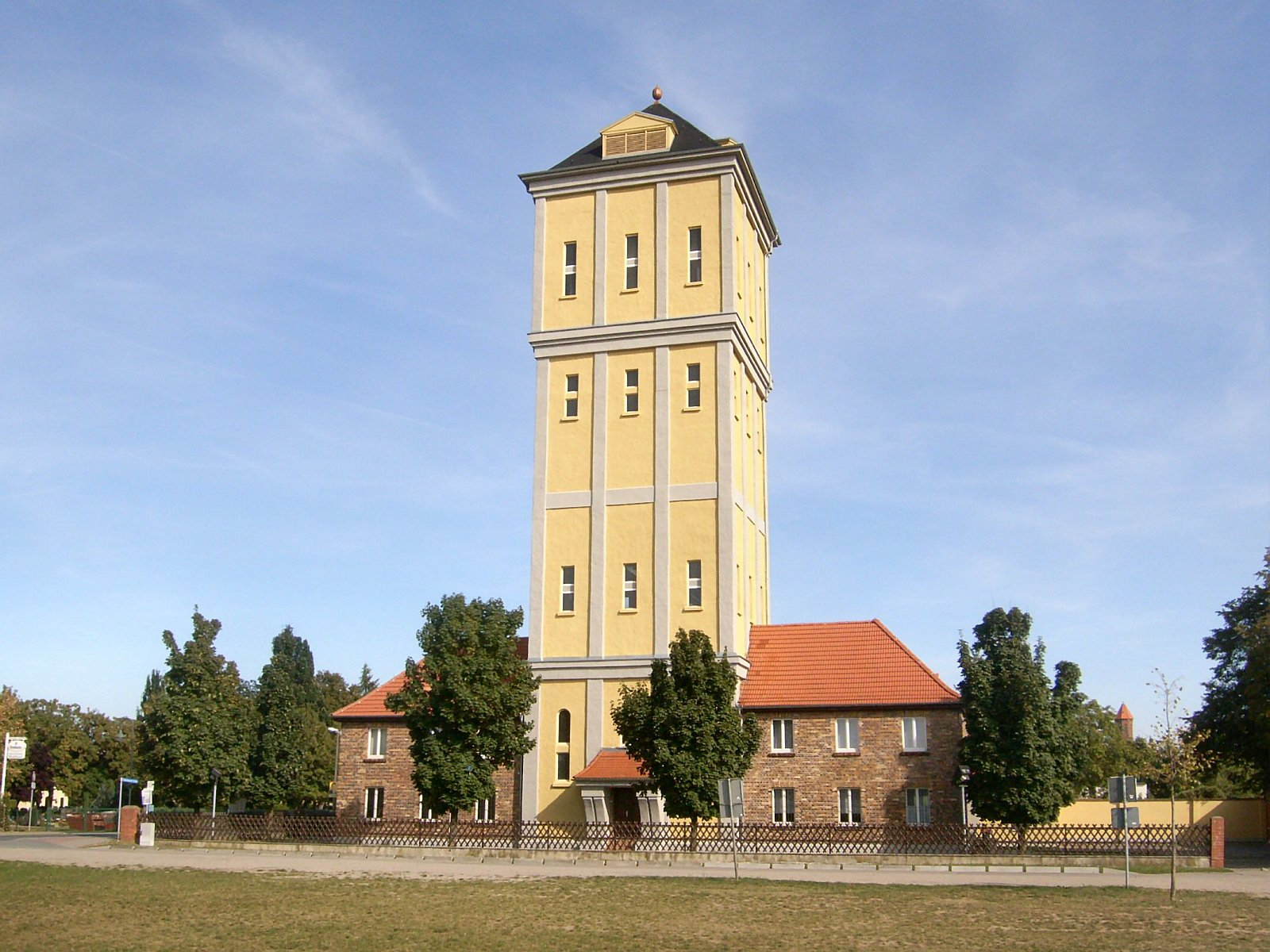

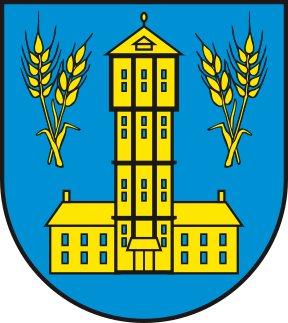
- Coat of arms
- Interactive map of Bobbau
- Location within Germany Location within Saxony-Anhalt
- Coordinates: 51°42′41″N 12°16′59″E
- Country: Germany
- State: Saxony-Anhalt
- District: Anhalt-Bitterfeld
- Town: Bitterfeld-Wolfen
- Subdivisions: 2

Area
  - Total: 7.94 km^{2} (3.07 sq mi)
- Elevation: 75–89 m (246–292 ft)

Population (2006-12-31)
  - Total: 1,661
  - Density: 209/km^{2} (542/sq mi)
- Time zone: UTC+01:00 (CET)
  - Summer (DST): UTC+02:00 (CEST)
- Postal codes: 06766
- Dialling codes: 03494
- Vehicle registration: ABI
- Website: bitterfeld-wolfen.de

Bobbau (German pronunciation: [ˈbɔbaʊ]) is a village and a former municipality in the district of Anhalt-Bitterfeld, in Saxony-Anhalt, Germany. Since September 1, 2009, it has been part of the town Bitterfeld-Wolfen.
