= Michael Gehrke =

American political consultant

Michael Gehrke is an American political consultant specializing in opposition research. He has served as the research director for the Democratic National Committee, the Democratic Senatorial Campaign Committee, the John Kerry presidential campaign, and in the White House during the Clinton Administration. He has also worked as executive director of the Senate Majority Project, which seeks to monitor the accountability of Republicans in the Senate.

Gehrke grew up in Salt Lake City, Utah. He holds a B.A. and a J.D. from the University of Utah. He got his start in opposition research as a young volunteer, taping opponent events and researching courthouse records. Gehrke is an advocate of public records research over private spying against candidates. Gehrke has said that his most exciting discovery of information occurred in the 2002 Louisiana senate runoff, when he discovered that the George W. Bush administration was secretly negotiating with the Mexican government to impose a tariff which would have harmed Louisiana trade. For the Republican senatorial candidate, who had enthusiastically aligned herself with Bush, the publicizing of the secret Bush deal was devastating, and the Bush administration ultimately canceled the deal.

Gehrke is somewhat of a pioneer in campaign "tracker programs." Gehrke also centralized video footage of Republican candidates and essentially made a digital archive from which voters could edit their own attack ads.

As the Research Director at the DNC, Gehrke established what amounted to systematic surveillance of Republican candidates and appealed to supporters to help him create "a Party apparatus that can immediately respond to missteps, lies, and scandals of the 2008 election cycle, and establish a narrative that our party’s nominee can use when the primary season ends," citing the "macaca moment" that put Democrat Jim Webb in the Senate as proof that tracker programs work: "Just as you helped put organizers on the ground in all 50 states, you can help build the Democratic Party’s research shop. Make a donation today."

Gehrke now works for GPS Impact media agency in Washington, D.C.

== Quotes by Michael Gehrke ==
Rather than relying on unconventional methods to uncover hidden material, modern researchers primarily focus on managing and analyzing publicly available information.
