= Chris Gehrke =

American racing driver

Christopher R. Gehrke (February 21, 1966 – May 7, 1991) was a racing driver who competed in ARCA.

== Career ==
Gehrke first began racing in open wheeled cars, winning the 1988 Spokane Grand Prix and finishing third in the SCCA Star Mazda Series. That same year, Chris also ran a couple of ARCA races in rented Bill Venturini Chevrolets. In 1989, Gehrke campaigned for rookie of the year honors in ARCA, finishing a close second behind Graham Taylor in rookie points and finishing seventh in the final driver standings. In 1990, Gehrke improved his performance in ARCA, finishing fourth in the points with five top-five finishes and eleven top-ten finishes. His best finish of the season was second at Toledo Speedway. Chris also proved that he could run on the bigger tracks, with fourth-place finishes at Atlanta and Pocono.

== Death ==
On the 67th lap of the 1991 Poulan Pro 500K at Talladega, Chris Gehrke spun in the tri-oval, resulting in his Oldsmobile flipping one time and hitting the outside wall. It then slid to rest in the middle of the track as a pack of cars approached. Carl Miskotten Jr., who was following behind a competitor, was unable to avoid Gehrke, and his Buick slammed the left rear tire of Gehrke’s Oldsmobile at nearly full speed.

Gehrke suffered serious head injuries and was transported to the Carraway Methodist Medical Center, where he would die three days later at 10:25 AM in the neuro-intensive care unit.

Miskotten Jr. suffered serious head and internal injuries due to the collision with Gehrke and was also transported to the same medical center, where doctors would stabilize his condition.

Two other drivers that were also involved in the wreck, Mike Davis and Bobby Massey, were shaken up in the crash. Both would be examined and released at the infield medical center.
