= Köpenick's week of bloodshed =

1933 violence in Germany

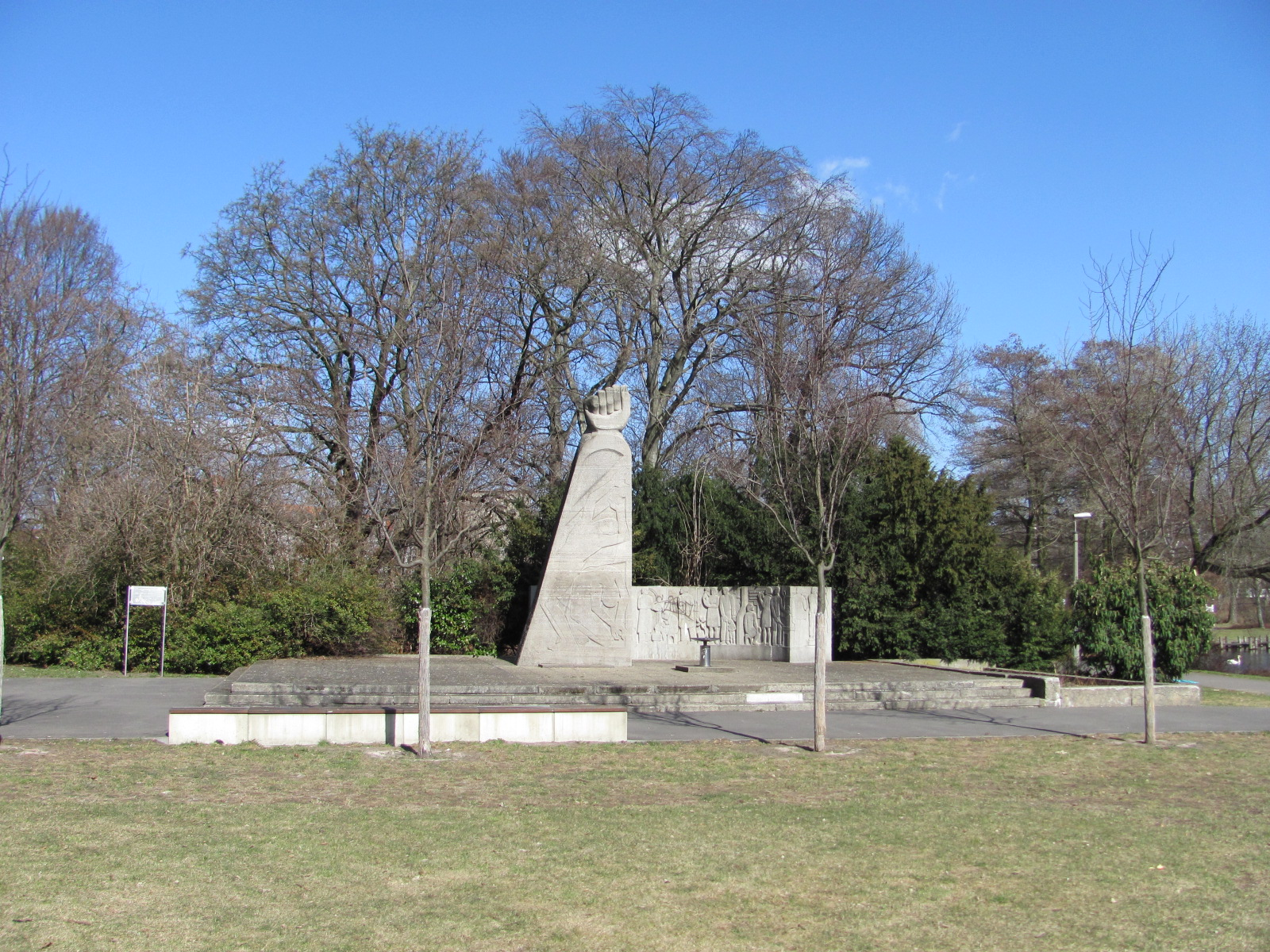

Köpenick's week of bloodshed (German "Köpenicker Blutwoche") is the name given to a week of arrests, torture, and killings by the SA between 21 and 26 June 1933. The event took place in Köpenick, a Berlin suburb widely perceived by the new government as a stronghold of Communists and Jewish residents. The victims were civilians.

Events were choreographed by SA-Sturmbannführer Herbert Gehrke. Approximately 500 opponents of National Socialism, identified as political non-conformists and Jews were detained by the local SA brigade, supported by police and SA groups from other parts of Berlin. Detainees were subjected to humiliation, torture, and murder. At least 25 died. Some died subsequently from the effects of torture: others survived but carried permanently the physical and mental scars of their ordeals. The Köpenicker Blutwoche was a high-profile early manifestation of changes set in place following Germany's January 1933 régime change: the deaths of "martyred" party members during the week of violence were heavily publicized by the party Gauleiter of Berlin, Joseph Goebbels. After the Nazi era came to an end, some of the perpetrators were tried and sentenced between 1947 and 1950.

The Köpenicker Blutwoche was only one of a whole range of "actions", both planned and spontaneous, undertaken by the SA and other Nazi institutions in the months following January 1933, targeting their political opponents, as the Nazis implemented their consolidation strategy, and established their dictatorship. Nevertheless, in the National Assembly (Reichstag) Election of March 1933, in the Berlin electoral district alone, the two principal left-wing parties, the SPD and the KPD (Communists), had between them mustered 1,377,000 votes.

== Places and events ==
The first attacks were launched on what later became the Elsengrund residential estate, close to the Berlin-Köpenick station. When unlawfully arrested on the first day, 24-year-old carpenter and Reichsbanner member Anton Schmaus fatally shot two SA men in self-defense while a third was killed by friendly fire, marking the outbreak of the violence. After his successful escape from the persecutors, Anton's family paid the price: his father, Johann Schmaus was first bestially tortured and then hanged in the shed behind the house in today's Schmausstraße 2 in Berlin-Köpenick to stage his suicide. Anton's mother, Katharina, and his 13-year-old sister, Margareta, were arrested and brought to the court building in Köpenick where Katharina was abused by the SA in the presence of her daughter. Katharina later had to spend multiple months in the hospital as a result of her treatment at the hands of the SA. Anton, who was an SPD party member and a trades union official, surrendered to the police in hopes of being protected from the SA. Instead, he was sent to the police headquarters prison on Alexanderplatz, tortured, then wounded by a shot in the back during an alleged escape attempt, later dying of his wound on 16 January 1934.

Two restaurants, the Gaststätte Demuth in Köpenick and the Gaststätte Seidler in nearby Berlin-Uhlenhorst, were used for torturing the anti-Fascists. Some of the detainees, after suffering torture, were taken to the local police headquarters at Seidler but were subsequently released.

Victims of "Köpenicker Blutwoche" were members of the Social Democratic and Communist Parties, along with those picked out as "Reichsbanner" democrats, National People's Party members, Jews, trades unionists and some politically engaged people who were independent of any political party. The better-known victims included the former minister-president of Mecklenburg-Schwerin, Johannes Stelling, the Reichsbanner leader Paul von Essen and the local Reichsbanner leader Richard Aßmann whose body was found in the Oder–Spree Canal. The communists Karl Pokern and Erich Janitzky were also killed. The number of people who died later as a result of injuries sustained under torture is unknown. Estimates concerning the number killed at the time also vary, ranging from 21 to 91, including up to 70 who simply "disappeared". The bodies of some of the victims, many of which were subsequently recovered, were tied up in sacks and thrown into surrounding waterways or the Schmöckwitz lakes. Those whose bodies turned up in the Dahme (river) included Johannes Stelling, Paul von Essen, and Karl Pokern mentioned above.

== Immediate follow-up ==
Government opponents risked their lives to try to expose the truth about the massacre, for instance using an illegal and ironically named underground Communist Party news sheet called "Luftschutz ist Selbstschutz". The Centre Party politician Heinrich Krone protested to the Ministry of the Interior and Pastor Ratsch protested to the Nazi mayor, but without success. The scale and brutality of the events was at the time effectively covered up by government propaganda, while three SA men who had been killed were publicly mourned and posthumously promoted. Their state funeral was attended by Goebbels and streets were renamed to commemorate them.

On 25 July 1933, a wide-ranging General Pardon was issued by the Justice Minister Franz Gürtner in respect of this and other atrocities committed as part of the Nazi take-over of the country.

== Trials in East Berlin and aftermath ==
Herbert Gehrke was killed in action shortly before the war ended.

The end of the Second World War in May 1945 was accompanied by the collapse of the Nazi regime. A large part of what remained of Germany, including East Berlin, now fell under Soviet administration: official interest in the "Köpenicker Blutwoche" resurfaced. Between 19 and 21 June 1947 four SA men found themselves charged with crimes against humanity in connection with the events in Köpenick fourteen years earlier. Two of these were found guilty and sentenced to terms of respectively eight years and eighteen months: the third was acquitted and the fourth managed to escape before the trial. Two more were tried, convicted, and sentenced to short prison terms in August 1948.

It was not until after the Soviet occupation zone had given way to the German Democratic Republic that a larger number of those allegedly complicit in the massacre faced trial. Between 5 June and 19 July 1950, a trial of 61 formally identified defendants took place in the Fourth Criminal Chamber at the District Court in East Berlin. Only 34 of the 61 indicted were actually present, and the remaining 27 were tried in absentia. 47 of the 61 were identified as SA men, three were identified as Nazi Party members, and one as an SS man. For the remaining ten, no equivalent affiliation was recorded. Of those tried in absentia, the whereabouts of 13 were unknown, while another ten were in West Germany, which since 1949 had been separated from East Germany politically and, increasingly, physically. Three others of the accused managed to escape before the trial; one was known to have died young. Those who had escaped to West Germany never faced trial.

Most or all of those tried were found guilty. Fifteen of them were sentenced to death, 13 to life in prison, and 29 to prison terms ranging from five to 25 years. Of those condemned to death, six were present for the trial. They were guillotined in Frankfurt on 20 February 1951.
