= Friedrich Hildebrandt =

German Nazi politician, Gauleiter, SS-Obergruppenführer (1898–1948)

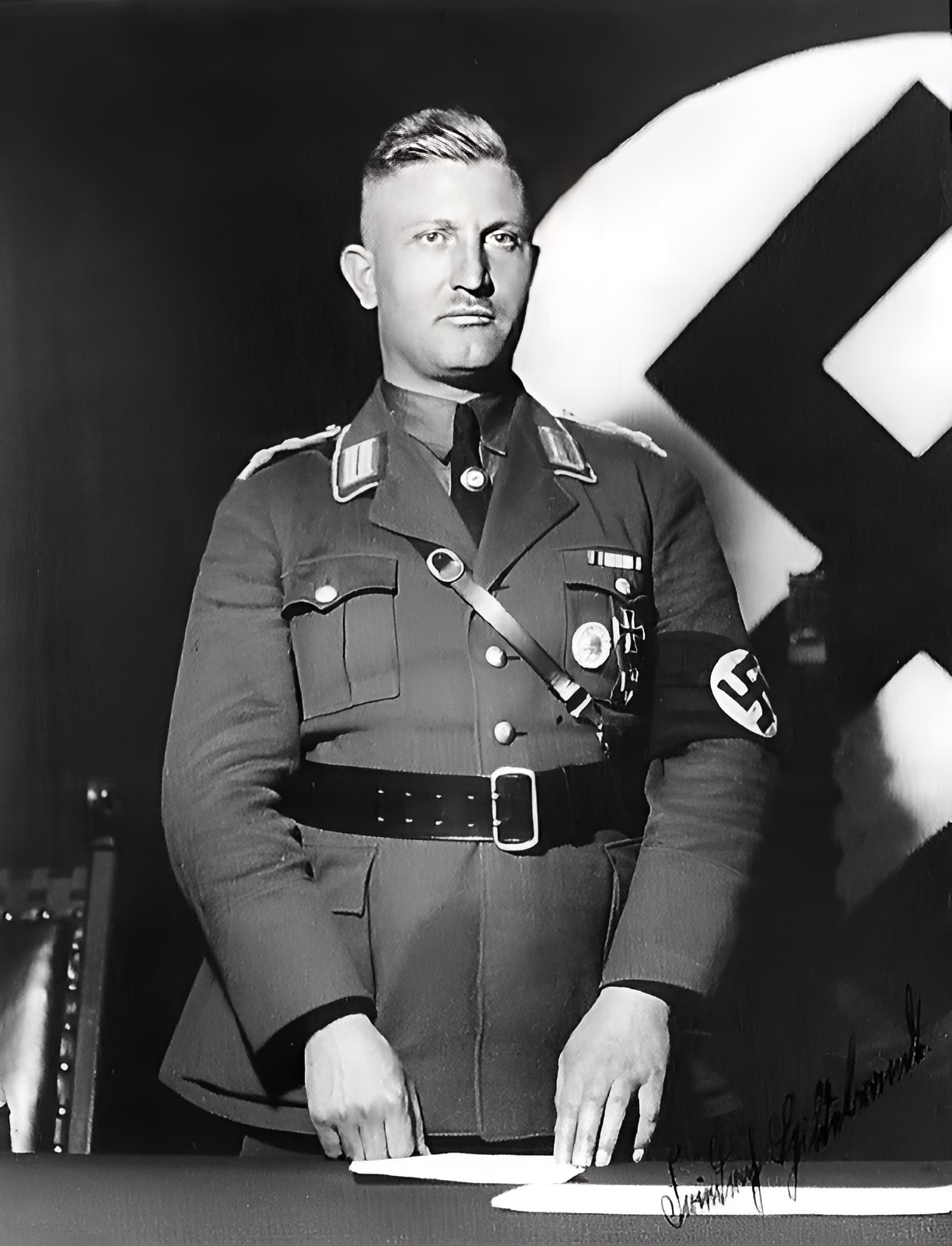
- Hildebrandt in 1933

Gauleiter of Mecklenburg-Lübeck
- In office 25 March 1925 – 1 April 1937

Gauleiter of Gau Mecklenburg
- In office 1 April 1937 – 8 May 1945

Reichsstatthalter of Mecklenburg-Schwerin
- In office 26 May 1933 – 31 December 1933

Reichsstatthalter of Mecklenburg-Strelitz
- In office 26 May 1933 – 31 December 1933

Reichsstatthalter of Mecklenburg
- In office 1 January 1934 – 8 May 1945

Reichsstatthalter of the Free City of Lübeck
- In office 26 May 1933 – 31 March 1937

Personal details
- Born: 19 September 1898 Kiekindemark (today, part of Parchim), Mecklenburg-Schwerin, German Empire
- Died: 5 November 1948 (aged 50) Landsberg Prison, Landsberg am Lech, Allied-occupied Germany
- Cause of death: Execution by hanging
- Party: Nazi Party; German Völkisch Freedom Party; German National People's Party

Military service
- Allegiance: German Empire; Nazi Germany
- Branch/service: Imperial German Army; Schutzstaffel
- Years of service: 1916–1920; 1933–1945
- Rank: Vizefeldwebel; SS-Obergruppenführer
- Awards: Iron Cross, 1st and 2nd class War Merit Cross, 1st and 2nd class with Swords

Friedrich Hildebrandt (19 September 1898 – 5 November 1948) was a German Nazi Party politician, a Gauleiter and an SS-Obergruppenführer. He was found guilty and executed for war crimes committed during the Second World War.

== Early life ==
Hildebrandt was born in Kiekindemark (today, part of Parchim) in Mecklenburg-Schwerin and was the son of a farm worker. He attended Volksschule until 1913 and then found employment as an agricultural worker and a railway employee. On 19 April 1916, he enlisted in the Imperial German Army during the First World War as a Kriegsfreiwilliger (war volunteer) and was assigned to Reserve-Infanterie-Regiment 24 on the western front. He was severely gassed in Flanders in 1917 and wounded twice again before the end of the war, for which he earned the Wound Badge in silver and the Iron Cross, first and second class. In January 1919, he returned to Mecklenburg and joined the Freikorps "von Brandis," seeing action in Upper Silesia and the Baltic states until his capture and imprisonment by the Red Army in Riga in July 1919. He was later repatriated to Germany, being discharged from the German Army as a Vizefeldwebel in January, 1920.

In March 1920, Hildebrandt joined the security police in Halle and participated in the suppression of the Kapp-Putsch. In the wake of the uprising, he was tried for excessive brutality against captured Spartakists in Osterfeld and Weißenfels. Although acquitted, he was dismissed from police service in June 1920. He then found employment as a farm worker and gardener. Originally joining the conservative German National People's Party, he later switched to the even more right-wing and anti-semitic German Völkisch Freedom Party and in 1924 was elected as one of its deputies to the Landtag of the Free State of Mecklenburg-Schwerin.

== Nazi Party career ==
Hildebrandt joined the Nazi Party in February 1925 (membership number 3,653) when it was refounded and, as an early member, he later was awarded the Golden Party Badge. On 27 March 1925 he was appointed Gauleiter of Gau Mecklenburg-Lübeck. In September 1925, he became a member of the National Socialist Working Association, a short-lived group of north and northwest German Gauleiter, organized and led by Gregor Strasser, which unsuccessfully sought to amend the Party program. It was dissolved in 1926 following the Bamberg Conference. In 1927, Hildebrandt became the founder and editor of a Nazi newspaper, the Niederdeutscher Beobachter, later also serving as editor of two additional such publications, the Lübecker Beobachter and the Strelitzer Beobachter. In 1929, he was again elected to the Landtag, this time as a Nazi deputy.

Briefly suspended as Gauleiter by Rudolf Hess in July 1930 for criticism of Adolf Hitler's alliance with industry, Hildebrandt was reinstated on 31 January 1931 after making a declaration of loyalty to Hitler. He was elected to the Reichstag in September 1930 as a deputy for electoral constituency 35 (Mecklenburg) and retained that seat until the fall of the Nazi regime. After the Nazi seizure of power, he was named Reichskommissar for the Free States of both Mecklenburg-Schwerin and Mecklenburg-Strelitz on 24 March 1933. He was subsequently elevated to the new post of Reichsstatthalter (Reich Governor) of Mecklenburg-Schwerin, Mecklenburg-Strelitz and the Free City of Lübeck on 26 May 1933. He thus united under his control the highest party and governmental offices in his jurisdictions. On 1 January 1934, the two Free States were combined into a unified Mecklenburg. From 1933 to 1934, Hildebrandt also served as the leader of the Nordische Gesellschaft (Nordic Society), which sought to strengthen German-Nordic cultural and political cooperation. He was also made a member of Hans Frank's Academy for German Law in 1935. On 1 April 1937, the Greater Hamburg Act transferred the City of Lübeck to Gau Schleswig-Holstein and Hildebrandt's Gau was renamed Gau Mecklenburg.

Hildebrandt became a member of the SS (member number 128,802) on 5 December 1933 with the rank of SS-Oberführer. He was made the honorary commander of SS-Standarte 22, headquartered in Schwerin, and was subsequently promoted to SS-Gruppenführer on 27 January 1934. He was assigned to the staff of the Reichsführer-SS on 23 January 1936. During the Second World War, he was promoted to SS-Obergruppenführer on 30 January 1942. Hildebrandt was named Reich Defense Commissioner for his Gau on 16 November 1942 and, on 25 September 1944, he was made commander of the Volkssturm (Nazi national militia) in his Gau.

Hildebrandt was involved in involuntary euthanasia for Aktion T4. In April 1941 he had the deaconess house in Lübtheen expropriated. The mentally handicapped children living there were then taken to the Lewenberg children's ward in Schwerin, where they were later murdered. During a meeting on 5 April 1941, Hildebrandt said "I had Lobetal cleaned. I had the idiots taken to where they belong."

In the winters of 1941/1942, several thousand Soviet POWs starved to death under Hildebrandt's jurisdiction in Mecklenburg. In a letter to the chancellery, he expressed his concern about the lack of slave labourers, and said the problem could be avoided if "enough Russians are delivered later." During a meeting with the Reich Defense Committee on 17 March 1942, Hildebrandt said "... for the Führer and for Adolf Hitler's cause, I pursue the law, even if it comes down to dead bodies." By the end of 1943, there were 152,148 foreign workers in Mecklenburg, most of whom were there against their will and were being exploited for slave labour.

== Post-war prosecution ==
After the war ended, Hildebrandt was arrested by British occupation authorities and interned. In 1946, he was transferred to U.S. custody after being implicated in the issuing of orders to summarily execute downed Allied airmen in 1944. Between 1946 and 1948, Soviet military occupation authorities repeatedly demanded Hildebrandt's extradition over his involvement in the euthanasia murders in Sachsenberg. However, all of these requests were rejected by the British and Americans.

Nevertheless, in 1947, Hildebrandt and six others were found guilty of their involvement in the murders of several downed American airmen at the Dachau trials. Six of those convicted, including Hildebrandt, were sentenced to death by hanging. The other, Fritz Schröder, was sentenced to 20 years in prison due to his lesser involvement and the judges concluding that he was a reluctant participant. Schröder was released from prison in February 1954.

Appeals for clemency for Hildebrandt were unsuccessful. He and his condemned codefendants were executed at Landsberg Prison on 5 November 1948. In his final statement, Hildebrandt blamed Communists for his execution.

"Captain, for twenty-six years I have been fighting against the Bolsheviks out of deep conviction, as a Mecklenburg farmer. They have sentenced me to death, but American marine soldiers delivered me from them. I am a victim, not of your courts, but of Communist elements who made statements against me. Since my home is in the Russian zone, I was not able to get all the material for my defense. God, protect my family and my poor five children."

== Bibliography ==
- Miller, Michael D.; Schulz, Andreas (2012). Gauleiter: The Regional Leaders of the Nazi Party and Their Deputies, 1925-1945. Vol. I (Herbert Albrecht – H. Wilhelm Huttmann). R. James Bender Publishing. ISBN 978-1-932970-21-0.
- Williams, Max (2015). SS Elite: The Senior Leaders of Hitler's Praetorian Guard. Vol. 1. Fonthill Media LLC. ISBN 978-1-781-55433-3.
