= Mecklenburg-Schwerin Landtag elections in the Weimar Republic =

German state elections

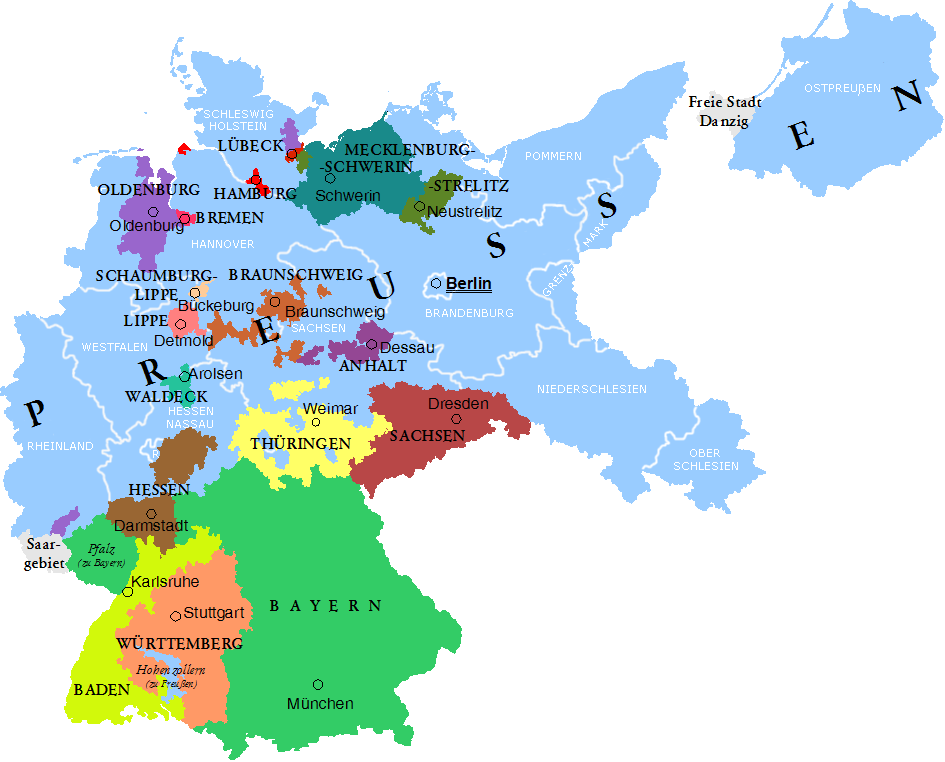
Mecklenburg-Schwerin in the Weimar Republic. At the top center in dark green.

Landtag elections in the Free State of Mecklenburg-Schwerin (Freistaat Mecklenburg-Schwerin) during the Weimar Republic were held at irregular intervals between 1919 and 1932. Results with regard to the total vote, the percentage of the vote won and the number of seats allocated to each party are presented in the tables below. On 31 March 1933, the sitting Landtag was dissolved by the Nazi-controlled central government and reconstituted to reflect the distribution of seats in the national Reichstag. The Landtag subsequently was formally abolished as a result of the "Law on the Reconstruction of the Reich" of 30 January 1934 which replaced the German federal system with a unitary state.

== 1919 ==
The 1919 Mecklenburg-Schwerin state election was held on 26 January 1919 to elect the 64 members of the Landtag.

1919 Mecklenburg-Schwerin state election
Party	Votes	%	Seats
Social Democratic Party of Germany	145,107	47.89	32
German Democratic Party	82,571	27.25	17
German National People's Party	39,709	13.11	10
Mecklenburg Village League	15,452	5.10	2
German People's Party	13,127	4.33	2
Economic Party	7,009	2.31	1
Total	302,975	100.00	64
Valid votes	302,975	99.16	
Invalid/blank votes	2,577	0.84	
Total votes	305,552	100.00	
Source: Elections in the Weimar Republic, Elections in Germany

== 1920 ==
The 1920 Mecklenburg-Schwerin state election was held on 13 June 1920 to elect the 64 members of the Landtag.

1920 Mecklenburg-Schwerin state election
Party	Votes	%	Seats	+/–
Social Democratic Party of Germany	127,612	39.92	26	–6
German National People's Party	70,708	22.12	14	+4
German People's Party	49,075	15.35	10	+8
Independent Social Democratic Party of Germany	24,455	7.65	5	New
Mecklenburg Village League	24,346	7.62	5	+3
German Democratic Party	22,210	6.95	4	–13
Communist Party of Germany	1,244	0.39	0	New
Total	319,650	100.00	64	0
Valid votes	319,650	99.62		
Invalid/blank votes	1,235	0.38		
Total votes	320,885	100.00		
Registered voters/turnout	383,366	83.70		
Source: Elections in the Weimar Republic, Elections in Germany

== 1921 ==
The 1921 Mecklenburg-Schwerin state election was held on 13 March 1921 to elect the 67 members of the Landtag.

1921 Mecklenburg-Schwerin state election
Party	Votes	%	Seats	+/–
Social Democratic Party of Germany	137,971	41.74	28	+2
German National People's Party	73,442	22.22	15	+1
German People's Party	57,813	17.49	12	+2
Mecklenburg Village League	19,452	5.88	4	–1
Communist Party of Germany	15,328	4.64	3	+3
German Democratic Party	14,127	4.27	3	–1
Reich Party of the German Middle Class	9,787	2.96	2	New
Independent Social Democratic Party of Germany	2,635	0.80	0	–5
Total	330,555	100.00	67	+3
Valid votes	330,555	99.15		
Invalid/blank votes	2,817	0.85		
Total votes	333,372	100.00		
Registered voters/turnout	391,600	85.13		
Source: Elections in the Weimar Republic, Elections in Germany

== 1924 ==
The 1924 Mecklenburg-Schwerin state election was held on 17 February 1924 to elect the 64 members of the Landtag.

1924 Mecklenburg-Schwerin state election
Party	Votes	%	Seats	+/–
German National People's Party	95,176	28.93	19	+4
Social Democratic Party of Germany	74,924	22.77	15	–13
German Völkisch Freedom Party	63,511	19.30	13	New
Communist Party of Germany	44,765	13.61	9	+6
German People's Party	23,962	7.28	5	–7
German Democratic Party	11,738	3.57	2	–1
Reich Party of the German Middle Class	5,122	1.56	1	–1
Land Party	4,553	1.38	0	New
Working Group of the Republican Party	2,721	0.83	0	New
Independent Social Democratic Party of Germany	2,521	0.77	0	0
Total	328,993	100.00	64	–3
Valid votes	328,993	99.50		
Invalid/blank votes	1,665	0.50		
Total votes	330,658	100.00		
Registered voters/turnout	405,019	81.64		
Source: Elections in the Weimar Republic, Elections in Germany

== 1926 ==
The 1926 Mecklenburg-Schwerin state election was held on 6 June 1926 to elect the 50 members of the Landtag.

1926 Mecklenburg-Schwerin Landtag election
Party	Votes	%	Seats	+/–
Social Democratic Party of Germany	111,404	39.90	20	+5
German National People's Party	63,237	22.65	12	–7
German Völkisch Freedom Party	26,160	9.37	5	–8
German People's Party	23,430	8.39	4	–1
Communist Party of Germany	18,463	6.61	3	–6
Reich Party of the German Middle Class	16,146	5.78	3	+2
German Democratic Party	8,475	3.04	2	0
Group for People's Welfare	7,287	2.61	1	New
Nazi Party	4,607	1.65	0	New
Total	279,209	100.00	50	–14
Valid votes	279,209	99.08		
Invalid/blank votes	2,586	0.92		
Total votes	281,795	100.00		
Registered voters/turnout	404,817	69.61		
Source: Elections in the Weimar Republic, Elections in Germany

== 1927 ==
The 1927 Mecklenburg-Schwerin state election was held on 22 May 1927 to elect the 52 members of the Landtag. Re-elections were held on 11 December 1927 in Grambow-Wendischhof and Sietow.

1927 Mecklenburg-Schwerin Landtag election
Party	Votes	%	Seats	+/–
Social Democratic Party of Germany	126,743	40.74	21	+1
German National People's Party	68,340	21.97	11	–1
Reich Party of the German Middle Class	33,249	10.69	6	+3
German People's Party	24,609	7.91	4	0
German Völkisch Freedom Party	17,734	5.70	3	–2
Communist Party of Germany	15,746	5.06	3	0
Group for People's Welfare	10,003	3.22	2	0
German Democratic Party	9,058	2.91	2	0
Nazi Party	5,611	1.80	0	0
Total	311,093	100.00	52	+2
Valid votes	311,093	99.20		
Invalid/blank votes	2,515	0.80		
Total votes	313,608	100.00		
Registered voters/turnout	412,135	76.09		
Source: Elections in the Weimar Republic, Elections in Germany

== 1929 ==
The 1929 Mecklenburg-Schwerin state election was held on 23 June 1929 to elect the 51 members of the Landtag.

1929 Mecklenburg-Schwerin Landtag election
Party	Votes	%	Seats	+/–
Unity List of National Mecklenburgers	140,151	44.58	23	New
Social Democratic Party of Germany	120,570	38.35	20	–1
Communist Party of Germany	16,451	5.23	3	0
Nazi Party	12,721	4.05	2	+2
German Democratic Party	8,962	2.85	1	–1
Mecklenburg Farmers' Party	8,087	2.57	1	New
Group for People's Welfare	7,461	2.37	1	–1
Total	314,403	100.00	51	+2
Valid votes	314,403	99.37		
Invalid/blank votes	1,984	0.63		
Total votes	316,387	100.00		
Registered voters/turnout	422,238	74.93		
Source: Elections in the Weimar Republic, Elections in Germany

== 1932 ==
The 1932 Mecklenburg-Schwerin state election was held on 5 June 1932 to elect the 59 members of the Landtag.

1932 Mecklenburg-Schwerin Landtag election
Party	Votes	%	Seats	+/–
Nazi Party	177,076	48.98	30	+28
Social Democratic Party of Germany	108,361	29.97	18	–2
German National People's Party	32,883	9.09	5	New
Communist Party of Germany	26,891	7.44	4	+1
German Democratic Party	7,889	2.18	1	0
German People's Party	7,499	2.07	1	New
Socialist Workers' Party of Germany	957	0.26	0	New
Total	361,556	100.00	59	+8
Valid votes	361,556	99.05		
Invalid/blank votes	3,455	0.95		
Total votes	365,011	100.00		
Registered voters/turnout	454,464	80.32		
Source: Elections in the Weimar Republic, Elections in Germany
