= Free State of Mecklenburg-Schwerin =

German state (1918–1933)

Free State of Mecklenburg-Schwerin Freistaat Mecklenburg-Schwerin (German)
- Federal State of the Weimar Republic
- 1918–1933
- Flag Coat of arms

- The Free State of Mecklenburg-Schwerin (red) within the Weimar Republic
- Capital: Schwerin
- Area
  - Coordinates: 53°38′10″N 12°30′10″E
  - 1925: 13,127 km^{2} (5,068 sq mi)
- Population
  - 1925: 674,411
  - Type: Republic
- Historical era: Interwar period
  - Established: 14 November 1918
  - Disestablished: 31 December 1933
Preceded by	Succeeded by
Grand Duchy of Mecklenburg-Schwerin	Mecklenburg
- Today part of: Germany

The Free State of Mecklenburg-Schwerin (German: Freistaat Mecklenburg-Schwerin) was a state in the Weimar Republic. It was established during the German revolution on 14 November 1918 upon the abdication of Grand Duke Frederick Francis IV of the Grand Duchy of Mecklenburg-Schwerin. On 1 January 1934, after the beginning of Nazi rule, Mecklenburg-Schwerin was united with the smaller neighbouring Free State of Mecklenburg-Strelitz to form the state of Mecklenburg. Today it is part of the German state of Mecklenburg-Vorpommern.

== History ==
=== German revolution ===
The German revolution of 1918–1919, which overthrew the German Empire and established the Weimar Republic, began with a sailors' mutiny in Kiel in late October 1918. The sailors rapidly spread the revolt across Germany, reaching Schwerin, Rostock and Wismar on 3 November. After occupying key buildings in Schwerin, they formed a workers' and soldiers' council on the model of the one set up at Kiel. On 14 November, Grand Duke Frederick Francis IV abdicated under the pressure of events and went with his family to Denmark. Two days later, a new governing ministry was formed made up of members of the Social Democratic Party (SPD) and the liberal German Democratic Party (DDP) under the leadership of Hugo Wendorff of the DDP. In two important early actions, the ministry abolished the feudal police powers of the nobility in rural districts and began the process of eliminating the estates of the realm as legal entities.

On 26 January, Mecklenburg-Schwerin held an election for a new Landtag (state parliament). The SPD won 48% of the vote, followed by the DDP at 27% and the anti-republican German National People's Party (DNVP) at 13%. It was not until 17 May 1920 that the Landtag approved the state's new constitution. Under it, the state parliament consisted of a Landtag with a varying number of members, but not fewer than 50, who were elected for a term of three years by universal suffrage. The state government, headed by a minister-president, was responsible to the Landtag and could be removed by a vote of no confidence.

=== Kapp Putsch ===
The Kapp Putsch (13–18 March 1920), a failed right-wing attempt to overthrow the government in Berlin, was particularly deadly in Mecklenburg-Schwerin. When the news of the coup attempt reached Schwerin, the labour unions and the three workers' parties (SPD, Independent Social Democrats and Communists) called for a general strike and occupied key buildings in the city. At meetings in Rostock and Wismar, workers decided to take up arms against the putsch. Generalmajor Paul von Lettow-Vorbeck, the Reichswehr brigade commander at Schwerin, put himself under the command of General Walther von Lüttwitz, one of the leaders of the putsch, and called on the Freikorps Roßbach for support. On 15 March, they opened fire on the workers occupying the Schwerin post office. The fighting left 14 workers and two soldiers dead.

In Rostock, armed workers surrounded the barracks where a group of regular and Freikorps troops had barricaded themselves. Their attempt to break out on 18 March ended with the death of one worker and the soldiers being surrounded and disarmed. The Freikorps Rossbach occupied Wismar on 19 March, after the putsch in Berlin had ended. Six workers were killed when firing broke out between them and the Freikorps troops; a seventh worker was taken prisoner and murdered. The Freikorps Rossbach troops left the city a few days later. At the Güstrow market square on 17 March, nine people were killed in fighting between workers and soldiers. Across Mecklenburg-Schwerin, 91 peopled died in the violence that accompanied the Kapp Putsch.

=== Nazi rise to power ===
For most of the Weimar period, the state governments of Mecklenburg-Schwerin were headed by either a Social Democrat, a member of the conservative German People's Party (DVP) or of the DNVP. In the June 1932 Landtag election, however, the Nazi Party became the largest party with 49% of the vote, and a Nazi, Walter Granzow, became minister-president on 13 July. Mecklenburg-Schwerin was one of only five states to have voted in a Nazi-led government before they came to power nationally.

Following the Nazi seizure of power at the national level, the government enacted the "Second Law on the Coordination of the States with the Reich". It established more direct control over the states by means of the new powerful position of Reichsstatthalter (Reich governor). Friedrich Hildebrandt was installed in the post on 26 May 1933. Hildebrandt, who was also Reichsstatthalter of the neighbouring Free State of Mecklenburg-Strelitz, consolidated the two into a new united state of Mecklenburg effective 1 January 1934.

== Leaders ==
=== President of the state ministry ===
- Hugo Wendorff (DDP) 1918–1919

=== Minister-presidents ===
- Hugo Wendorff (DDP) 1919–1920
- Hermann Reincke-Bloch (DVP) 1920–1921
- Johannes Stelling (SPD) 1921–1924
- Joachim Freiherr von Brandenstein (DNVP) 1924–1926
- Paul Schröder (SPD) 1926–1929
- Karl Eschenburg (Consortium of National Mecklenburgers) 1929–1932
- Walter Granzow (NSDAP) 1932–1933
- Hans Egon Engell (NSDAP) 1933

=== Reichsstatthalter ===
- Friedrich Hildebrandt (NSDAP) 1933

== See also ==
- Mecklenburg-Schwerin Landtag elections in the Weimar Republic
