= Erhard Hübener =

German politician (1881–1958)

Dr. Erhard Hübener
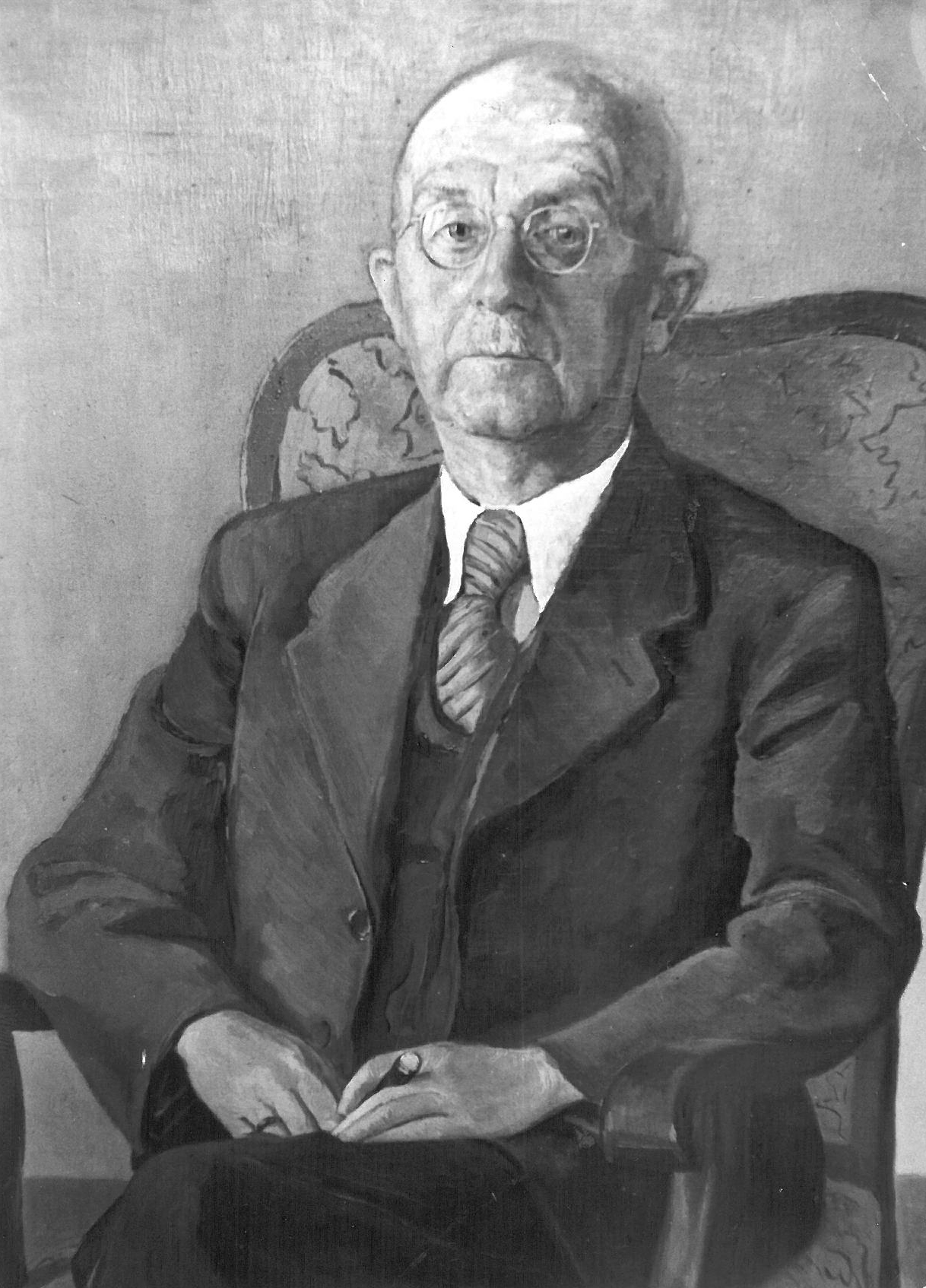
- Erhard Hübener

Minister-President of Saxony-Anhalt
- In office 3 December 1946 – 1 October 1949
- Succeeded by: Werner Bruschke

Personal details
- Born: 4 August 1881 Tacken, Kingdom of Prussia, German Empire
- Died: 3 June 1958 (aged 76) Gadderbaum, North Rhine-Westphalia, West Germany
- Party: DDP (until 1933); LDPD (from 1945)

Dr. Erhard Hübener (4 August 1881 – 3 June 1958) was a German politician and member of the German Democratic Party (DDP) until 1933. After World War II he engaged in rebuilding structures of self-rule in the Soviet occupation zone and was a co-founder and member of the Liberal Democratic Party of Germany (LDPD).

== Early years ==
Hübener was born in Tacken (now part of Groß Pankow (Prignitz)), Province of Brandenburg. His father was a Protestant pastor. After attending the school at Pforta, Hübener studied history and political science at Christian Albert's University, Kiel, and Frederick William's University, Berlin. He graduated with a doctorate. Hübener and Otti Bornemann married in 1909. He served as an officer in World War I.

== First term of political career ==
After the war, he joined the liberal DDP. In 1919 Otto Fischbeck (DDP), Prussian minister of trade gained him as a collaborator in the Prussian ministry of trade. In 1922 Hübener was elected vice land captain of the Prussian Province of Saxony with Rudolf Oeser (*1858–1926*) serving as Saxon land captain.

In 1924 the Saxon Provinziallandtag (provincial parliament) elected him Landeshauptmann (land-captain), the elected highest-ranking representative of provincial self-rule. He distinguished himself as an expert in economics and administration, searching for consensus among the representatives of the different parties.

Already in the 1920s, he developed ideas for a reorganisation of the heterogenous German states. So he proposed the creation of an independent state called Saxony-Anhalt, combining Prussian Saxony and the independent Free State of Anhalt. In 1930 the members of the provincial parliament reelected him, land captain, for another six years with the votes of the SPD, DDP, and DNVP.

The Nazi regime compulsorily pensioned him after their takeover in 1933. Hübener then dedicated his time and effort to scientific and artistic questions, publishing smaller works in these fields under the pseudonym J.S. Erhard.

== Second term of political career ==
After the US Army had invaded the Province of Saxony in April 1945 the U.S. Group Control Council, Germany (precursor of the OMGUS) reappointed him land-captain of the Province of Saxony. By early July the US Army retired to allow the Red Army to take Prussian Saxony as part of its Soviet occupation zone, as agreed by the London Protocol in 1944.

On 9 July the Soviet SVAG ordered to merge of what before 1933 had been the land of Anhalt, two Bezirke of the Prussian province of Saxony, Halle-Merseburg, and Magdeburg, and some Brunswickian eastern exclaves and salients into the Land of Saxony. The third Bezirk of Prussian Saxony, the Erfurt governorate, had become a part of Thuringia. Then the SVAG appointed Hübener as the president of the Province of Saxony, a newly created function based in Halle upon Saale.

In the summer of 1945, Hübener became one of the co-founders of the Liberal Democratic Party of Germany (LDPD) in Halle upon Saale. He also received a chair at the Martin Luther University of Halle-Wittenberg. Although he had signed, as Soviet-appointed official, the Soviet-inspired expropriation ordinance on 3 September 1945, pretendingly aim at Nazi war criminals and other circles (largely real estate holders, often of noble descent) uniformly identified as apt for expropriation, he criticized the abuse of the expropriation ordinance as a free ticket to completely destroy property structures and certainty of law.

On the occasion of the first only election in the Soviet zone, allowing parties to compete for seats in provincial and state parliaments, on 20 October 1946, the Province of Saxony has renamed the Province of Saxony-Anhalt, reflecting the prior merger. On 3 December 1946, the members of the provincial parliament elected Hübener the first minister-president of Saxony-Anhalt with the votes of CDU and LDPD. This made him the only governor in the Soviet zone, who was not a member of the Communist Socialist Unity Party of Germany (SED). As such, he was an inconvenience to the Soviet occupation authorities.

By threatening the SVAG to resign from office, Hübener enforced the participation of the Soviet zonal governors in the Conference of Governors in Munich on 5 June 1947, which last time convened the elected governors of all states from all four zones of occupation in Germany. Hoping to avoid the eventual establishment of separate German republics – which was underways with the Bizone – he was, however, disappointed by his Western colleagues (among them his long-time fellow party member Reinhold Maier, then minister-president of Württemberg-Baden). Most of them were already assured that the constitution of a democratic and autonomous German republic can impossibly include the Soviet zone with their puppet states, whereas the zonal central administrations (Zentralverwaltungen) established in July 1945, staffed with communists and directed by the SVAG, were taking the decisions.

While Easterners hoped with a quadripartite Allied agreement there would be the chance that the Soviet Union will release its prey, many Westerners had already come to another conclusion. However, for Westerners, the perpetuated stay of their respective occupying power had by no means the same meaning in everyday life as the Soviet occupation in their zone.

Hübener then saw himself fighting a losing battle. In May 1949, speaking on the third term of Deutscher Volkskongress, a quasi-parliament deciding the first constitution of the to-be-founded separate East German republic, Hübener appealed as the main speaker of LDPD to the delegates: Our future government shall, will, and must learn, to stand with a free people on the free ground. While West Germany had been founded on 23 May 1949 the foundation of East Germany was planned for 7 October. On 1 October Hübener resigned from office. He was succeeded by Werner Bruschke (SED).

== Late years ==
While many of his political friends fled oppression and persecution in the Soviet zone and later East Germany and East Berlin, Hübener stayed. He retired totally from politics and committed himself again to studies in art and history. He wrote his autobiography, later published in West Germany. He died during a stay at the health spa of Bad Salzuflen in West Germany on 3 June 1958. His remains were translated to East German Wernigerode, where he had spent his retirement.

== Legacy ==
The Free Democratic Party, section Sachsen-Anhalt, established in his honour the Erhard-Hübener-Stiftung, a foundation in Halle upon Saale. In Magdeburg a square was named after him.

== Works ==
- Erhard Hübener, Lebenskreise. Lehr- und Wanderjahre eines Ministerpräsidenten, Cologne and Vienna: Böhlau, 1984, (=Mitteldeutsche Forschungen; vol. 90), ISBN 3-412-05483-6.
- Erhard Hübener, "Liberales als soziale Verantwortung", in: LDP-Informationen; No. 3 (1949).
