= Hans-Joachim Böhme =

East German politician (1929–2012)

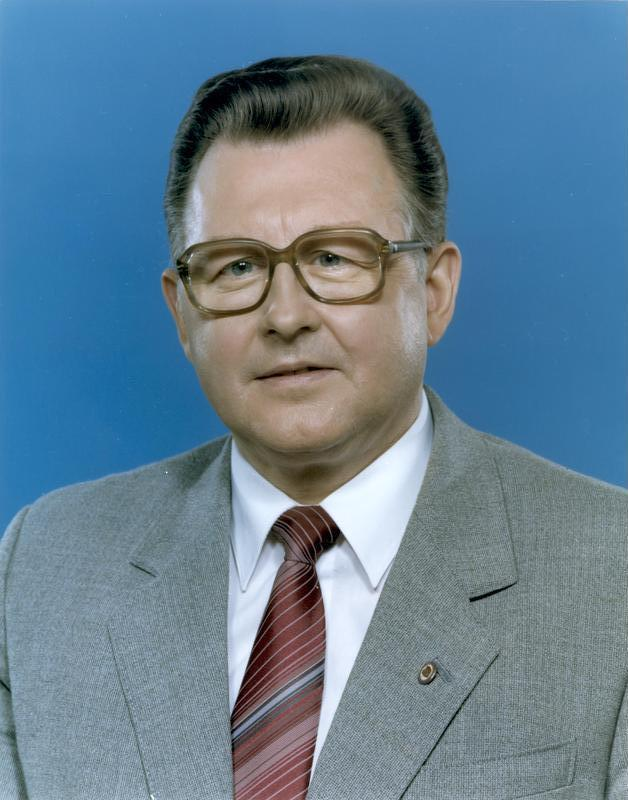
- Böhme in 1986

First Secretary of the Socialist Unity Party in Bezirk Halle
- In office 4 May 1981 – 9 November 1989
- Second Secretary: Walter Kitzing
- Preceded by: Werner Felfe
- Succeeded by: Roland Claus
Volkskammer
Member of the Volkskammer for Bezirk Halle
In office 16 June 1986 – 16 November 1989
Preceded by	Werner Felfe
Succeeded by	Eberhard Sandmann
Constituency	Merseburg, №1
In office 25 June 1981 – 16 June 1986
Preceded by	Harald Rost
Succeeded by	Margot Honecker
Constituency	Halle/Saale, Halle-Neustadt, №2

Personal details
- Born: Hans-Joachim Böhme; 29 December 1929 Bernburg (Saale), Free State of Anhalt, Weimar Republic (now Saxony-Anhalt, Germany)
- Died: 4 September 2012 (aged 82) Halle (Saale), Saxony-Anhalt, Germany
- Party: SED-PDS (1989–1990)
- Other political affiliations: Socialist Unity Party (1946–1989); Social Democratic Party (1945–1946)
- Education: "Karl Marx" Party Academy (Dipl.-Ges.-Wiss.); Martin Luther University Halle-Wittenberg (Dr. phil.)
- Occupation: Politician; Party Functionary; Civil Servant
- Awards: Patriotic Order of Merit, 1st class; Order of Karl Marx
- Central institution membership: 1986–1989: Full member, Politburo of the Central Committee; 1981–1989: Full member, Central Committee; Other offices held: 1974–1981: Second Secretary, Socialist Unity Party in Bezirk Halle; 1968–1974: Secretary for Agitation and Propaganda, Socialist Unity Party in Bezirk Halle

Hans-Joachim "Achim" Böhme (29 December 1929 – 4 September 2012) was an East German politician and party functionary of the Socialist Unity Party (SED).

In the 1980s, he served as First Secretary of the SED in Bezirk Halle, center of East Germany's large and important chemical industry, and eventually became a full member of the SED Politburo.

Described as "The Little King of Halle" in an obituary, Böhme was notorious for his particularly totalitarian leadership style and embezzlement of public funds. He was tried and convicted of complicity in manslaughter in the Berlin Wall shooting trials.

== Life and career ==
=== Early career ===
Hans-Joachim Böhme was born in Bernburg (then part of the Free State of Anhalt) on 29 December 1929 to a working-class family. After the Second World War, Böhme worked as a civil servant in the district of Bernburg. In 1945, he also joined the Social Democratic Party (SPD), which was forcibly merged with the Communist Party of Germany (KPD) to form the Socialist Unity Party of Germany (SED) in 1946. Böhme briefly chaired the Free German Youth (FDJ), the only legal youth movement in East Germany, in the district of Bernburg from 1948 to 1949.

Afterward, Böhme became a full-time party functionary of the SED. He initially served as department head of the SED in the district of Bernburg and the party organization at the VEB Mansfeld Kombinat Wilhelm Pieck and later deputy department head of the Saxony-Anhalt and, after the states were abolished in 1952, the Bezirk Halle SED. From 1955 to 1958, he studied at the SED's "Karl Marx" Party Academy in Berlin, graduating with a diploma in social sciences (Dipl.-Ges.-Wiss.). He subsequently served as a secretary of the SED in the district of Weißenfels until 1963.

=== Bezirk Halle SED career ===
Böhme moved to the Bezirk Halle SED in 1963, working his way up in the department for agitation and propaganda, eventually becoming department head.

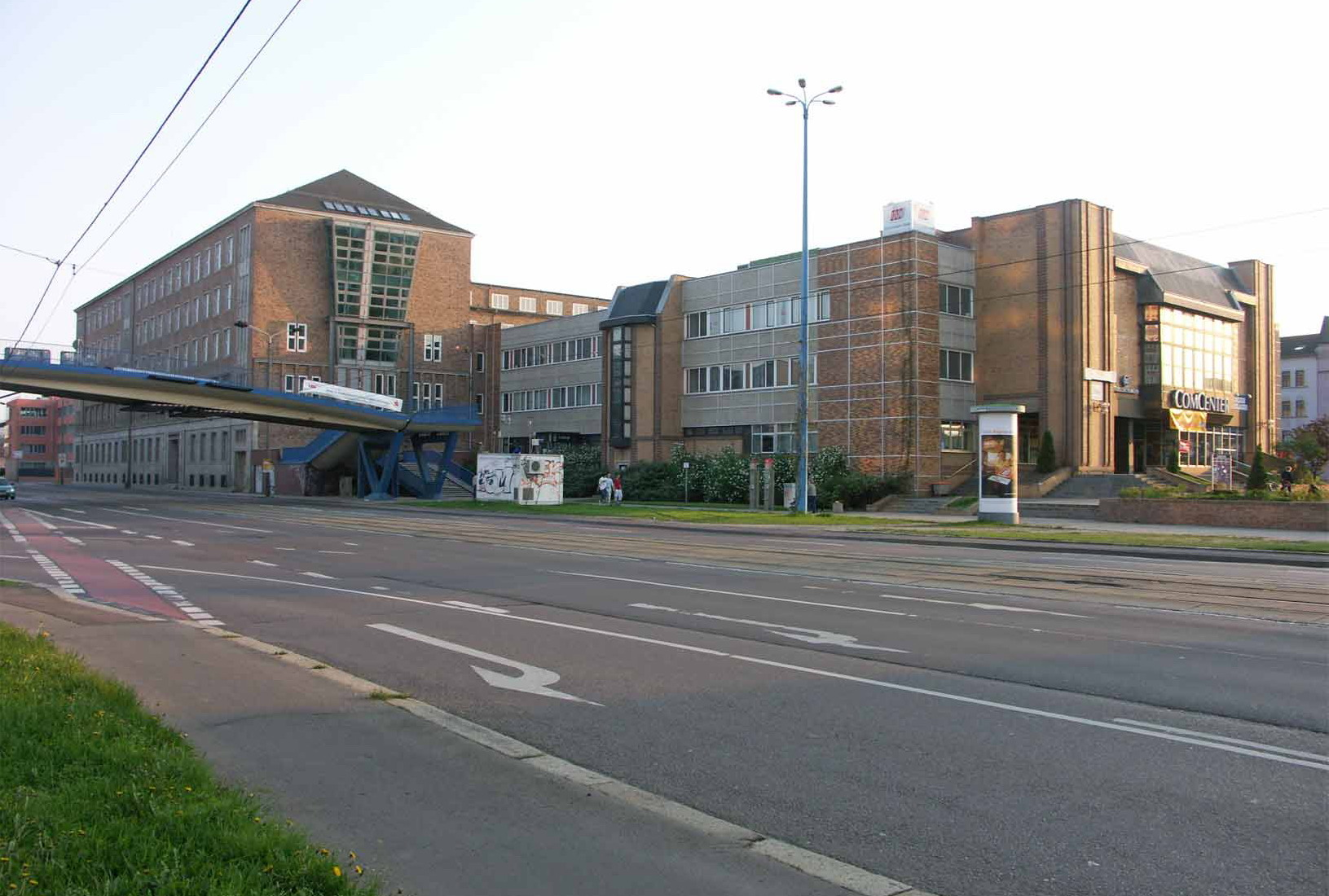
Former Bezirk Halle SED building in May 2006, still known today as "Café Böhme" in local vernacular

In 1967, he obtained his doctorate (Dr. phil.) from the University of Halle with a thesis on the topic "Political Consciousness Formation in Socialism – Issues of political consciousness formation in the period of comprehensive socialism development in the GDR and its management by the Marxist–Leninist party, illustrated by the activities of the SED leadership in Bezirk Halle".

A year later, he succeeded Werner Felfe as Secretary for Agitation and Propaganda of the Bezirk party and when Dieter Itzerott was transferred to study at the "Karl Marx" Party Academy in February 1974, Böhme succeeded him as Second Secretary.

On 4 May 1981, Böhme rose to the position of the First Secretary of the SED in Bezirk Halle, incumbent Werner Felfe joining the Central Committee Secretariat as Secretary responsible for Agriculture.

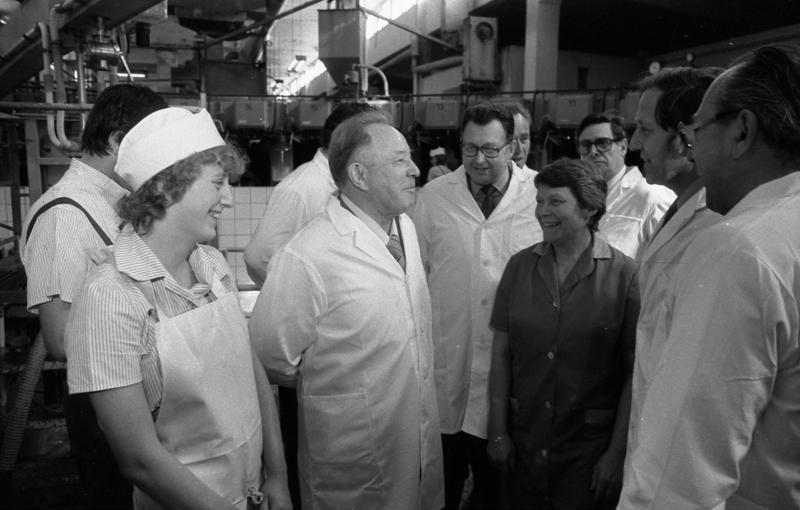
Böhme (right of center) and Stasi head Erich Mielke (left of center) visiting dairy farmers in Nessa in May 1981

From April 1981 (X. Party Congress) until its collective resignation in December 1989, Böhme was a full member of the Central Committee of the SED. From 21 April 1986 (XI. Party Congress) until his resignation in November 1989, he was also a full member of the SED Politburo, the de facto highest leadership body in East Germany, Bezirk Halle being an important center of the chemical industry. He additionally became a member of the Volkskammer in 1981, nominally representing constituencies in his Bezirk, first Halle/Saale and Halle-Neustadt, then the district of Merseburg.

Böhme's eight-year absolute rule over Bezirk Halle was viewed extremely negatively. His leadership style was authoritarian, occasionally described as absolutist, and he was viewed as a hardliner. Unlike other First Secretaries such as Hans Modrow and Werner Walde, he lived a lavish lifestyle. He was accused of embezzlement and personal enrichment, among other things funneling 45.000 East German mark public money into the construction of a Blankenburg Forest lodge. Despite evidence, he was acquitted in 1990 and 1993 after spending two months in pre-trial detention.

=== Peaceful Revolution ===
Early on during the Peaceful Revolution, Herbert Heber, First Secretary of the SED in the Bezirk Halle district of Köthen, wanted to resign amid intense public pressure. Böhme refused his request, instead berating, insulting and threatening him. On 4 November 1989, Heber shot himself. Two days later, in his last public appearance as First Secretary, Böhme tried to address a opposition rally in the market square in front of the Halle City Hall, but he was only booed and even spat at. Protesters also blamed him for Heber's suicide.

On 8 November 1989, on the eve of the fall of the Berlin Wall, Böhme was reelected to the Politburo at the ninth meeting of the Central Committee, though he had by far the largest number of votes against him of all elected members, with 66 votes against of 157 voting. Only a day later, the Bezirk Halle SED removed him, 64 to 4, from the position of First Secretary and installed reformer Roland Claus as his successor. Böhme's removal was a topic of Günter Schabowski's press conference that led to the fall of the Berlin Wall.

Böhme consequently resigned from the Politburo he had just been reelected to. He was removed by his party from the Volkskammer a week later, on 16 November 1989.

Böhme did not take any personal responsibility for the failure of the SED, instead blaming the other members of the SED Bezirk Halle Secretariat. On 20 January 1990, he was expelled in absentia, still being held in pre-trial detention, from the now-renamed SED-PDS in a unanimous vote, the party Central Arbitration Commission citing personal enrichment and his reaction to the demonstrations.

=== Reunified Germany ===
Like other former Politburo members, Böhme was charged with "complicity in manslaughter" (political responsibility for the fatal shootings at the Berlin Wall) by the Berlin Regional Court in the Berlin Wall shooting trials. After initially being acquitted in 2000, Böhme was convicted on 6 August 2004, receiving a suspended sentence, 15 months of probation. Böhme at no point offered an explanation for his activities in the East Germany.

He lived withdrawn as a retiree in Halle-Neustadt, dying after long illness in a nursing home in the early morning hours of 4 September 2012 at age 82. The Volksstimme described him as "The Little King of Halle" in their obituary.
