= Province of Magdeburg =

Prussian province within Nazi Germany (1944–45)

Province of Magdeburg Provinz Magdeburg (German)
- Province of Prussia
- 1944–1945
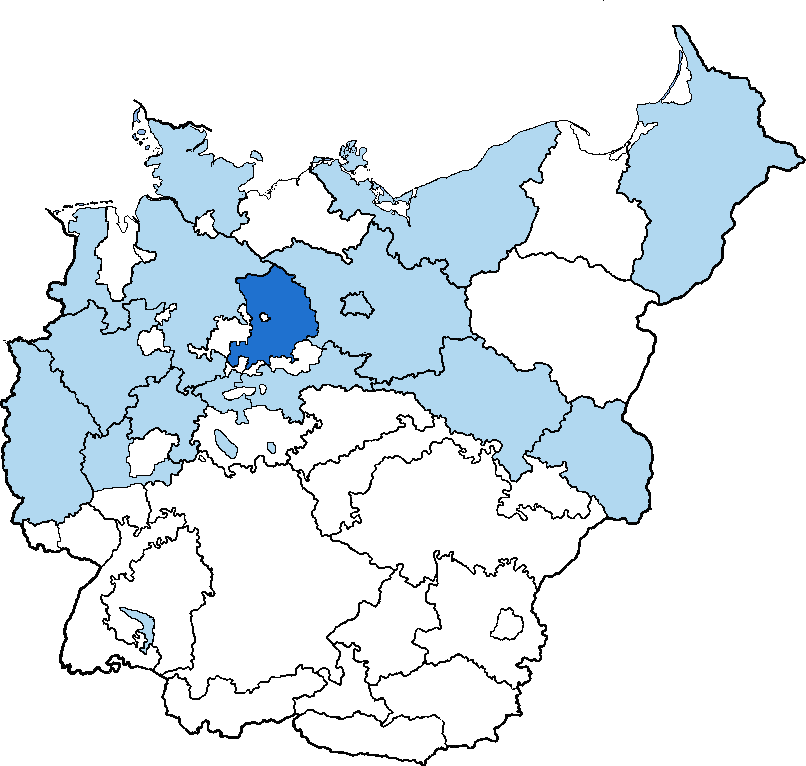
- The Province of Magdeburg in 1944.
- Capital: Magdeburg
- Area
  - 1933^{a}: 11,587.87 km^{2} (4,474.10 sq mi)
- Population
  - 1933^{a}: 1.303.848
- Government
  - Type: Province
- High President
  - 1944–1945: Rudolf Jordan
- Historical era: World War II
  - Established: 1 July 1944
  - Disestablished: 23 July 1945
Preceded by	Succeeded by
Province of Saxony	Saxony-Anhalt (1945–1952)
- a. Within 1944/45 borders.

The Province of Magdeburg (German: Provinz Magdeburg) was a province of the Free State of Prussia within Nazi Germany from 1944 to 1945. The provincial capital was Magdeburg.

The province was created on 1 July 1944 out of Regierungsbezirk Magdeburg, a government region from the former Province of Saxony.

The province was occupied by American troops after the conquest of Magdeburg in April 1945 during World War II. After the territory was transferred from American to Soviet control, it was merged with Halle-Merseburg and Anhalt to recreate the Province of Saxony, (Note: The original Prussian Province of Saxony also included the territory of the Province of Erfurt, which became part of Thuringia, and did not include Anhalt. Some other minor enclaves of the Prussian province were also integrated into the new province.) later renamed the Province of Saxony-Anhalt and ultimately the Federal State of Saxony-Anhalt.

== Districts in 1945 ==
=== Regierungsbezirk Magdeburg ===
Urban districts

1. Aschersleben
2. Burg bei Magdeburg
3. Halberstadt
4. Magdeburg
5. Quedlinburg
6. Salzwedel
7. Stendal

Rural districts

1. Calbe a./S.
2. Gardelegen
3. Haldensleben
4. Jerichow I (seat: Burg bei Magdeburg)
5. Jerichow II (seat: Genthin)
6. Oschersleben (Bode)
7. Osterburg
8. Quedlinburg
9. Salzwedel
10. Stendal
11. Wanzleben
12. Wernigerode
13. Wolmirstedt
