= Werner Felfe =

German politician (1928–1988)

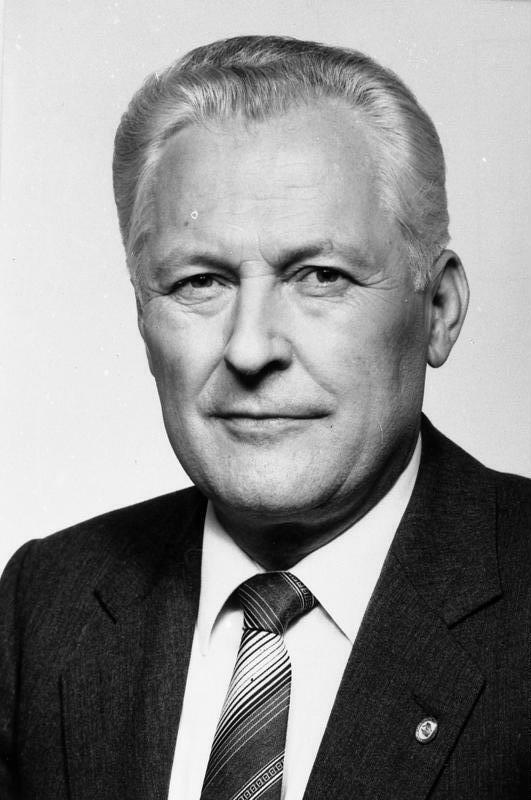
- Felfe in 1982

Secretary for Agriculture of the Central Committee Secretariat
- In office 16 April 1981 – 7 September 1988
- General Secretary: Erich Honecker
- Preceded by: Gerhard Grüneberg
- Succeeded by: Werner Krolikowski

First Secretary of the Socialist Unity Party in Bezirk Halle
- In office 22 May 1971 – 4 May 1981
- Second Secretary: Dieter Itzerott; Hans-Joachim Böhme
- Preceded by: Horst Sindermann
- Succeeded by: Hans-Joachim Böhme
Volkskammer
Member of the Volkskammer
In office 16 June 1986 – 7 September 1988
Preceded by	Manfred Ewald
Succeeded by	Beatrix Dreschel
Constituency	Pasewalk, Prenzlau, Strasburg, Templin, Ueckermünde, №1
In office 29 November 1971 – 16 June 1986
Preceded by	Rolf Poche
Succeeded by	Hans-Joachim Böhme
Constituency	Merseburg, №1

Personal details
- Born: Werner Felfe; 4 January 1928 Großröhrsdorf, Free State of Saxony, Weimar Republic (now Germany)
- Died: 7 September 1988 (aged 60) East Berlin, East Germany
- Cause of death: Heart failure
- Resting place: Memorial of the Socialists, Friedrichsfelde Central Cemetery
- Party: Socialist Unity Party (1946–1988)
- Other political affiliations: Communist Party of Germany (1945–1946)
- Education: "Karl Marx" Party Academy; Dresden University of Technology (Dipl.-Ing.-Ökon.)
- Occupation: Politician; Party Functionary; Industrial Clerk
- Awards: Patriotic Order of Merit, 1st class; Order of Karl Marx; Hero of Labour; Order of Friendship of Peoples
- Central institution membership: 1986–1988: Full member, Politburo of the Central Committee; 1973–1986: Candidate member, Politburo of the Central Committee; 1963–1988: Full member, Central Committee; 1954–1963: Candidate member, Central Committee; Other offices held: 1981–1988: Member, State Council; 1976–1988: Member, National Defence Council; 1968–1971: Second Secretary, Socialist Unity Party in Bezirk Halle; 1954–1957: Second Secretary, Free German Youth; 1950–1953: First Secretary, Socialist Unity Party in Flöha district

Werner Felfe (4 January 1928 – 7 September 1988) was an East German politician and high-ranking party functionary of the Socialist Unity Party (SED).

Felfe served as the longtime First Secretary of the SED in Bezirk Halle, center of the East Germany's large and important chemical industry, and was a member of the Politburo of the Central Committee of the SED. In the 1980s, he was the powerful SED Agriculture Secretary, instituting various reforms to the GDR's collectivized agricultural sector.

Until his surprising death in September 1988, he was thought of as a potential successor to Erich Honecker.

== Life and career ==
=== Early career ===
Felfe, the son of a machine worker from the Bischofswerda district, undertook a commercial apprenticeship as an industrial clerk and subsequently worked as a commercial employee.

In 1945, Felfe joined the Communist Party of Germany (KPD), becoming a member of the Socialist Unity Party (SED) in 1946 following the forced merger of the KPD with the Social Democratic Party (SPD). In 1946, he also joined the newly founded Free German Youth (FDJ), being made secretary of the Kamenz district FDJ.

Felfe became a full-time SED party functionary later in 1946, initially as clerk of the Kamenz district SED, eventually being promoted to department head and later secretary. In 1950, he was made instructor of the Saxony SED and in 1950, he joined the SED's nomenklatura as First Secretary of the SED in the district of Flöha, a heavily industrialized district in the Ore Mountains.

In 1953, he was delegated to the SED's "Karl Marx" Party Academy in Berlin for a one-year course. He thereafter made Second Secretary of the FDJ, candidate member of the Central Committee of the SED and a member of the Volkskammer in 1954.

Felfe's political rise eventually was slowed down. In 1957, he was demoted to a local government functionary in heavily industrialized Bezirk Karl-Marx-Stadt and had to leave the Volkskammer the next year. From 1957 to 1960, Felfe eventually headed the Zschopau district government and from March 1960 to September 1963, he chaired the Bezirk Karl-Marx-Stadt government. In all of these positions, he was de facto subservient to the respective local SED leadership.

In January 1963 (VI. Party Congress), he was finally made a full member of the Central Committee of the SED, additionally being delegated to study at the Dresden University of Technology's Industrial Institute. He graduated in 1965 with a degree in industrial engineering (Dipl.-Ing.-Ökon.) and was subsequently promoted to the Central Committee apparatus as deputy head of the Agitation and Propaganda Department, first working under Horst Sindermann.

=== Bezirk Halle SED career ===
In 1966, Felfe joined the Bezirk Halle SED led by Sindermann as Secretary for Agitation and Propaganda. In 1968, he became its Second Secretary after longtime incumbent Gerhard Frost left for university and in May 1971, he became the First Secretary, succeeding Sindermann, who joined the Council of Ministers as First Deputy Chairman.

From 1971, he was once again a member of the Volkskammer, nominally representing the district of Merseburg of Bezirk Halle, then the rural southeast of Bezirk Neubrandenburg.

Since 1973, he was additionally a candidate member and since 1976 (IX. Party Congress) a full member of the Politburo of the Central Committee of the SED, the de facto highest leadership body in East Germany, Bezirk Halle being an important centre for the chemical industry. He joined the National Defense Council the same year.

Felfe was awarded the Patriotic Order of Merit in 1974 and the Order of Karl Marx in 1978.

=== Agriculture Secretary ===
In April 1981, shortly before the X. Party Congress, SED Agriculture Secretary Gerhard Grüneberg unexpectedly died of a tumour at age 59. Felfe was chosen as his successor, also joining the State Council. the GDR's collective head of state. The agriculture portfolio was considered a difficult one.

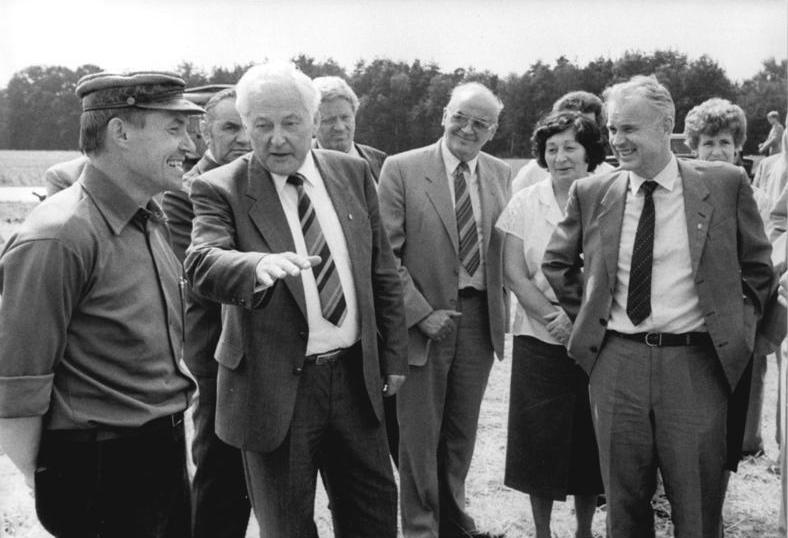
Felfe (left of center) and Bezirk Dresden SED First Secretary Hans Modrow (right) visiting farmers in Crostwitz in August 1987

As Central Committee Secretariat Secretary responsible for the Central Committee Agriculture Department, he was the most powerful agricultural policymaker in the country and continued the course correction of his predecessor, eliminating the devastating separation between animal and plant production, reducing bureaucracy and saving resources. Felfe enjoyed high popularity during his tenure. Central Committee employee Manfred Uschner later recounted Felfe as being one of the few Politburo members open to criticism.

In this capacity, he also traveled to socialist countries and, in 1985 and 1987, to West Germany, where he met with Chancellor's Office Minister Wolfgang Schäuble, Minister of Agriculture Ignaz Kiechle and his predecessor Josef Ertl. He overall became known as a reformer.

Felfe was awarded an honorary doctorate by the Academy of Agricultural Sciences of the GDR and the Hero of Labour title in 1988.

=== Support for the Perestroika ===
After publicly warning in 1984 about the "growing revanchist forces" in West Germany, an article was published on 8 August 1988, in the West German news magazine Der Spiegel, speculating about potential successors to Erich Honecker.

The article suggested the autumn of 1989 as the time for the change, presuming that the 40th anniversary of the founding of the GDR would be an appropriate date. Alongside eventual successor Egon Krenz, Siegfried Lorenz, and Günter Schabowski, Felfe was mentioned as a potential candidate for Honecker's succession in the article. Felfe was (approximately) quoted in the article as saying, "The political perestroika must not stop at the GDR."

This put Felfe into a difficult situation, the SED and Honecker in particular being known as hardliners.

=== Death ===
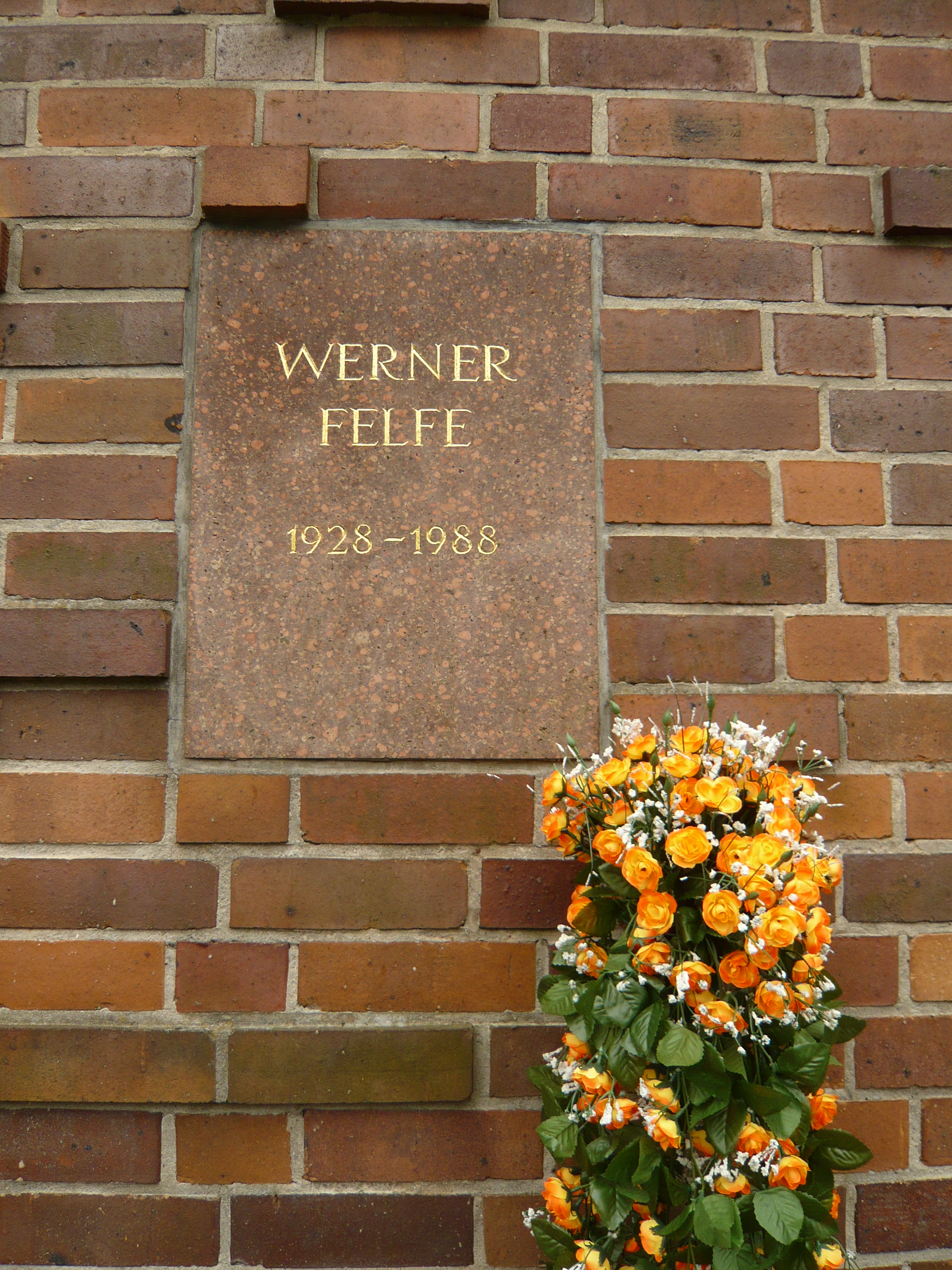
Felfe's grave in 2009

Just under a month after the article was published, Felfe surprisingly died at the age of 60 due to acute heart failure, according to official reports in East Berlin, according to another source while hunting near Strasburg (Uckermark). His death was attributed to stress from excessive work as well as hypertension and heart disease.

His urn was interred in the Memorial of the Socialists at the Friedrichsfelde Central Cemetery in Berlin-Lichtenberg. He was the last person to whom the Politburo granted a grave site there.

The search for a successor proved to be difficult. He eventually was succeeded as Agriculture Secretary by Werner Krolikowski in December 1988.
