= Bezirk Halle =

District of the former East Germany

District of Halle Bezirk Halle
- District (Bezirk) of East Germany
- 1952–1990
- Flag Coat of arms

- Location of Bezirk Halle within the German Democratic Republic
- Capital: Halle/Saale
- Area
  - 1989: 8,771 km^{2} (3,387 sq mi)
- Population
  - 1989: 1,776,500
- Government
- First Secretary of the Socialist Unity Party
  - 1952–1953: Bernard Koenen
  - 1953–1954: Heinz Glaser
  - 1954–1958: Franz Bruk
  - 1958–1963: Bernard Koenen
  - 1963–1971: Horst Sindermann
  - 1971–1981: Werner Felfe
  - 1981–1989: Hans-Joachim Böhme
  - 1989–1990: Roland Claus
- Chairman of the Council of the Bezirk
  - 1952–1954: Werner Bruschke
  - 1954–1958: Helmut Becker
  - 1958–1966: Otto Leopold
  - 1966–1984: Helmut Klapproth
  - 1984–1990: Alfred Kolodniak
  - 1990: Wolfgang Süss
  - 1990: Klaus Keitel (as Regierungsbevollmächtigter)
- Legislature: Bezirkstag Halle
- History
  - Established: 1952
  - Disestablished: 1990
Preceded by	Succeeded by
Saxony-Anhalt (1945–1952)	Saxony-Anhalt; Thuringia
- Today part of: Germany

The Bezirk Halle was a district (Bezirk) of East Germany. The administrative seat and the main town was Halle.

== History ==
The district was established, with the other 13, on 25 July 1952, substituting the old German states. After 3 October 1990 it was disestablished as a consequence of the German reunification, becoming again part of the state of Saxony-Anhalt except Artern kreis, which became part of Thuringia.

== Geography ==
=== Position ===
The Bezirk Halle bordered with the Bezirke of Magdeburg, Potsdam, Cottbus, Leipzig, Gera and Erfurt.

=== Subdivision ===
The Bezirk was divided into 23 Kreise: 3 urban districts (Stadtkreise) and 20 rural districts (Landkreise):

- Urban districts : Dessau; Halle; Halle-Neustadt.
- Rural districts : Artern; Aschersleben; Bernburg; Bitterfeld; Eisleben; Gräfenhainichen; Hettstedt; Hohenmölsen; Köthen; Merseburg; Naumburg; Nebra; Quedlinburg; Querfurt; Roßlau; Saalkreis; Sangerhausen; Weißenfels; Wittenberg; Zeitz.

== See also ==
- Regierungsbezirk Halle
- Regierungsbezirk Dessau
