= Chemical industry in Germany =

The chemical industry in Germany is a well-established industry who produce a large amount of EU fuel.

Currently the German industry, turning over 160 billion euros is the European leader, and the third-biggest in the world. It is Germany's third-largest industry, after Germany's much-renowned automotive industry, and its mechanical engineering industry. The largest German chemical company is BASF, turning over 59 billion euros in 2020, with around 110,000 workers.

== History ==
Before World War II, the German chemical industry was the European leader.

=== Synthetic fuel ===
The German oil industry after World War I depended mostly on synthetic oil made at the Leuna works, led by Carl Bosch and Fritz ter Meer.

By 1944, Germany was making 4m tonnes of synthetic fuel per year.

=== Post war ===
After World War II, the industry was not making any amount of organic chemicals, but by the mid-1950s, the West German industry was making around a third of the output of organic chemicals as the UK.

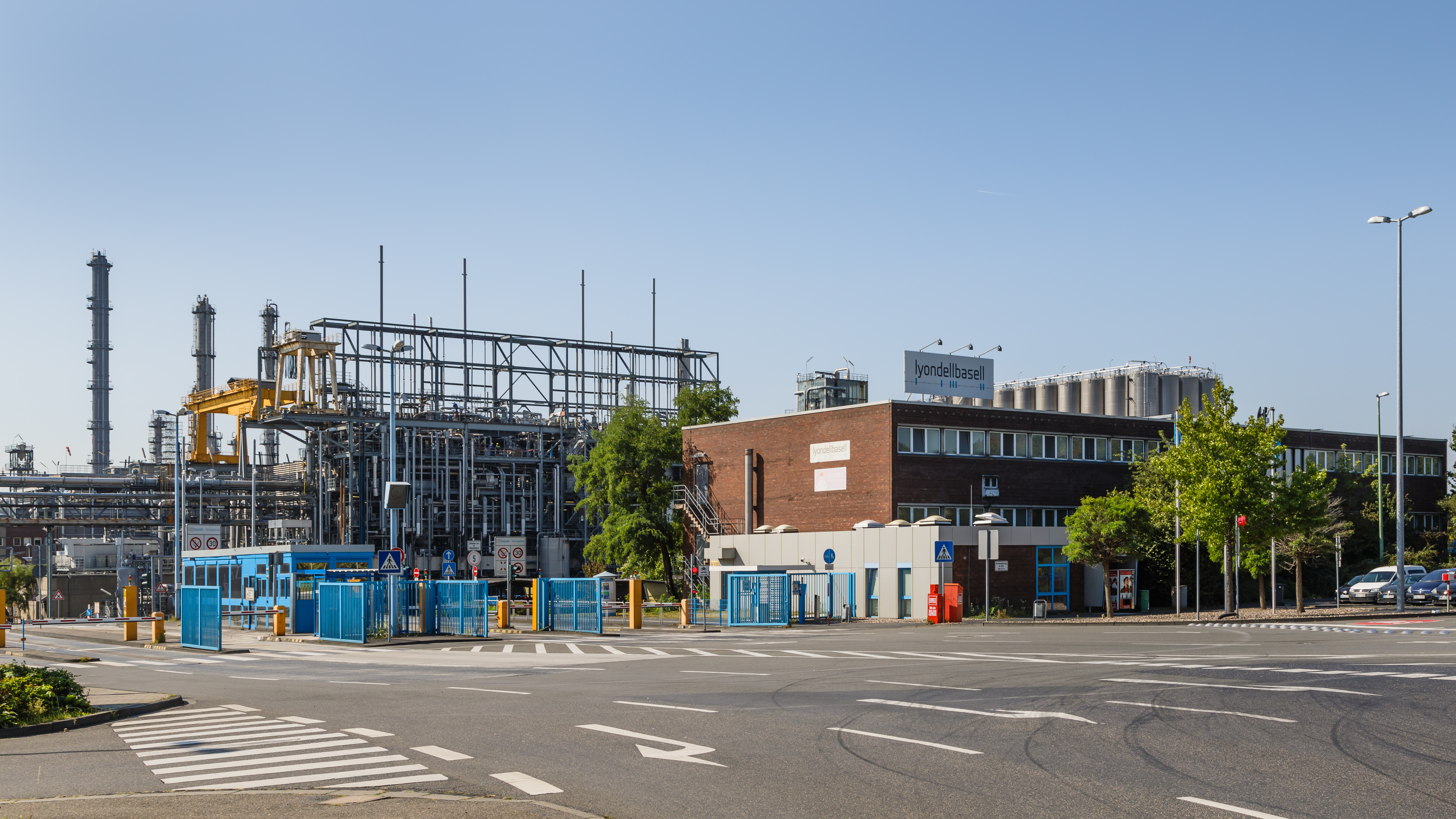
Wesseling plant in September 2016

BASF was refounded from 1952 to 1953, largely under Bernhard Timm.

The first petrochemical plant in West Germany opened in Wesseling on September 29, 1955. In a joint-arrangement between BASF, and the Anglo-Dutch Royal Dutch Shell, who supplied the oil. The plant would make 6,000 tons of polyethylene a year, to be raised to 10,000 tons. It was the British ICI process of making polyethylene, made by BASF under licence. All chemical production in Germany, before this plant, was from synthetic types of oil, made from coke. The site today is run by LyondellBasell.

=== Timeline ===
- Badische Anilin und Soda Fabrik is formed, better known as BASF, in the Grand Duchy of Baden in 1865; one of its first important chemists is Carl Bosch, whose uncle was Robert Bosch, owner of the company that invented the spark plug (by Gottlob Honold around 1901, who also largely developed the automotive headlamp with a parabolic reflector)
- in 1872 Eugen Baumann discovered PVC, although it would not be until Waldo Semon developed methods in the US in the late 1920s could PVC be largely made
- in 1899 Hans von Pechmann added diazomethane to ether, and noted the formation of polymethylene, a type of polyethylene, identified in 1900 by Eugen Bamberger and Friedrich Tschirner, but had not realised that it has any commercial significance; ICI in Cheshire in England will, in 1933
- in September 1909 Fritz Hofmann (chemist) applies for a patent for the first synthetic rubber (isoprene), when working at Farbenfabriken Bayer in Elberfeld in North Rhine-Westphalia; in the 1910s, the Germans realised that methyl isoprene, known as dimethylbutadiene, could be made from acetone; 2,000 tons of synthetic rubber was made in World War I; only when Samuel E. Horne Jr. made polyisoprene in the US in 1955, was it made commercially
- in 1912 polyvinyl acetate (PVA) was discovered by Fritz Klatte
- before World War I, the German chemical industry was producing 90% of the world's dyes
- in 1917 F Gunther, working with Kurt Meyer, the research manager of BASF took out a patent for an early soap called Nekal A, the first synthetic surface-active substance (surfactant). From 1930 Boehme Fett Chemie made sodium lauryl sulfate (sodium dodecyl sulfate), from a copper catalyst; this was an anionic surfactant. M Wittmer at BASF in 1930 made non-ionic surfactants, from ethylene oxide condensation.
- in 1928 Otto Röhm, with Walter Bauer at Darmstadt, is one of the discoverers of perspex, which he trademarks as Plexiglas; his company, with Otto Haas, becomes Rohm and Haas in Esslingen am Neckar in 1907, in the north of Baden-Württemberg, being bought for $15bn in 2009 by Dow Chemical Company
- Herman Mark, with Kurt Meyer, and Carl Wolff, worked with X-ray diffraction, to make styrene in the 1920s
- Hermann Staudinger worked on polymers from 1920, and from 1910 with isoprene at BASF, invented polystyrene; in 1931, BASF start manufacturing polystyrene
- From April 1936, synthetic rubber was made at the Buna Werke Schkopau, set up by Carl Bosch and Carl Krauch.
- Chemische Werke Hüls is built in 1938, now the Marl Chemical Park
- in 1953 Karl Ziegler, at the Max Planck Institute for Coal Research, with Ehrhard Holzkamp, discovered a better way of making polyethylene at lower temperatures and pressures, via triethylaluminium and a Ziegler–Natta catalyst; for this Ziegler took the 1963 Nobel Prize in Chemistry
- in March 1954, Karl Rehn, at Hoechst, made polypropylene with a Ziegler catalyst, but did not apply for a patent
- in June 1954 Karl Ziegler, with Heinz Martin, made polypropylene with a Ziegler catalyst, allowing Hoechst to commercially manufacture polypropylene from 1958; polypropylene is the world's second-most produced synthetic polymer, after polyethylene

=== Exports ===
By 1960 West Germany was exporting 40% more chemicals than the UK, according to the British Productivity Council.

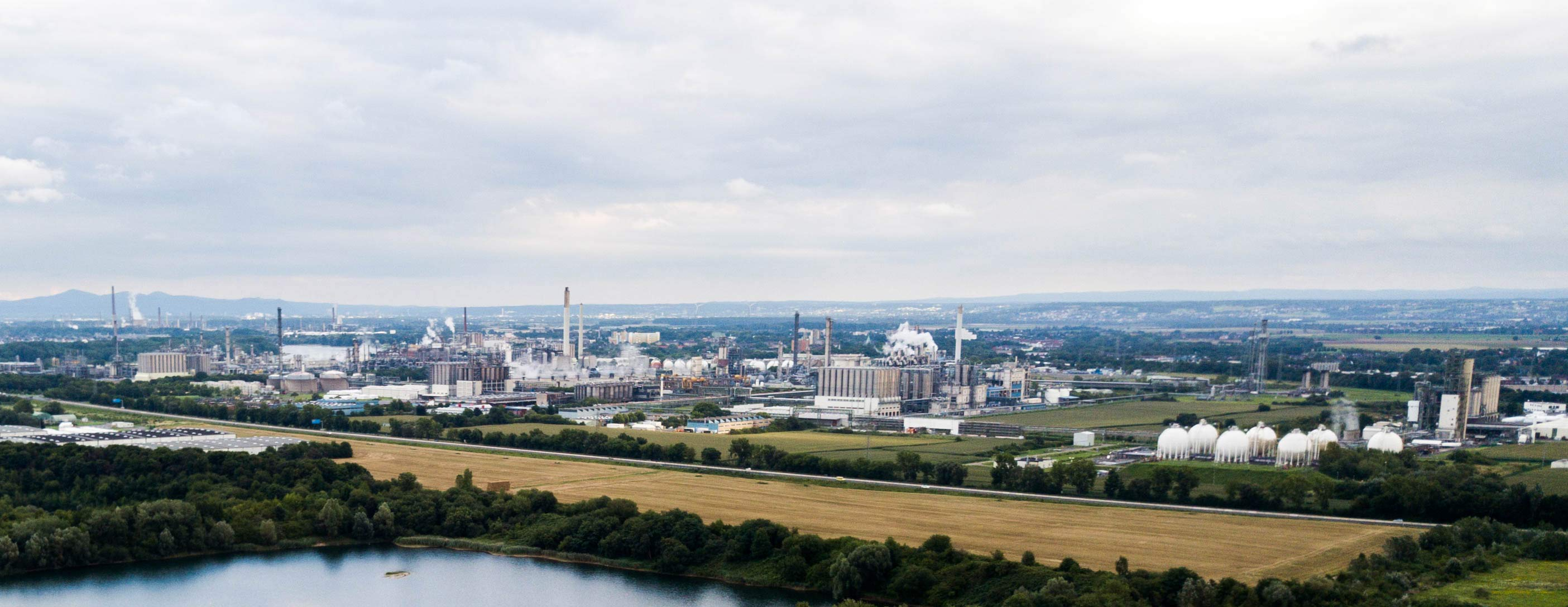
Chemical works in Godorf, in North Rhine-Westphalia, in August 2017

== Research ==
=== Magnetic recording technology ===
Anorgana GmbH at Gendorf, in Bavaria, was the first development site of magnetic tape production, although it was quite primitive at first. Friedrich Matthias, at BASF, led the chemical development. The choice of chemical film came from John Eggert, a former professor of Photochemistry at the University of Berlin, at Agfa Wolfen (now ORWO) at Wolfen, Germany, later part of East Germany. From 1936, Magnetite, Fe3O4, was the type recording compound.

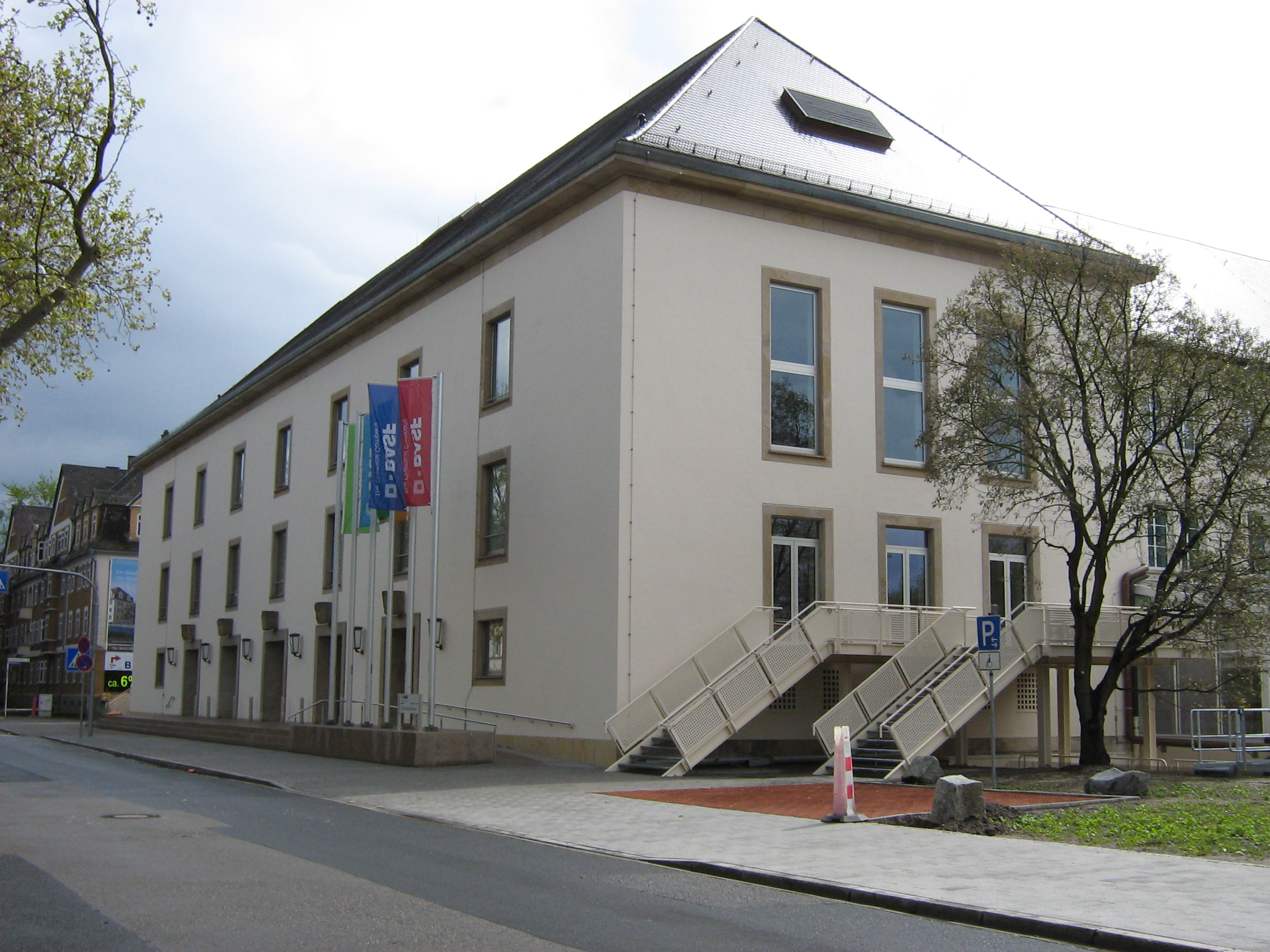
BASF Feierabendhaus

On a controversial tour of Germany during 1936, the London Philharmonic Orchestra made the first recognised full sound recording on magnetic tape on November 19, 1936, at the BASF Feierabendhaus (the company auditorium), but the sound was not as good as wax transcription discs, due to DC bias.

From around Heinrich Jacqué, of BASF, developed a way to make PVC tape, which was produced from September 1940, with a calendering machine. BASF chemist Rudolf Robl developed a coating for the PVC, Tetrahydrofuran (THF). Production was moved to Wald-Michelbach and Aschbach in Bergstraße (district), on the southern edge of the German state of Hesse.

After the war, magnetic recorders were manufactured in Wedel in north Germany, in Schleswig-Holstein, from around 1948. Germany was divided into four zones of occupation, which restricted trade across these zones of occupation.

Gamma ferric oxide (Iron(III) oxide) was the recording compound from 1939, from a 1935 BASF patent. All magnetic recording would be with this type of compound until around 1971.

The magnetic technology made its way across the Atlantic, where Semi Joseph Begun, a native German and the husband of the German NASA engineer Ruth Begun, had conducted elementary research from August 1943. He worked with the Battelle Memorial Institute in Columbus, Ohio.

== Turnover by year ==
=== West Germany ===
- 1956 £1,300m
- 1957 £1,450m

== Energy consumption ==
The chemical industry consumes around 8% of Germany's energy, with 15% of Germany's natural gas, and 10% of Germany's electricity.

== Chemical plants ==
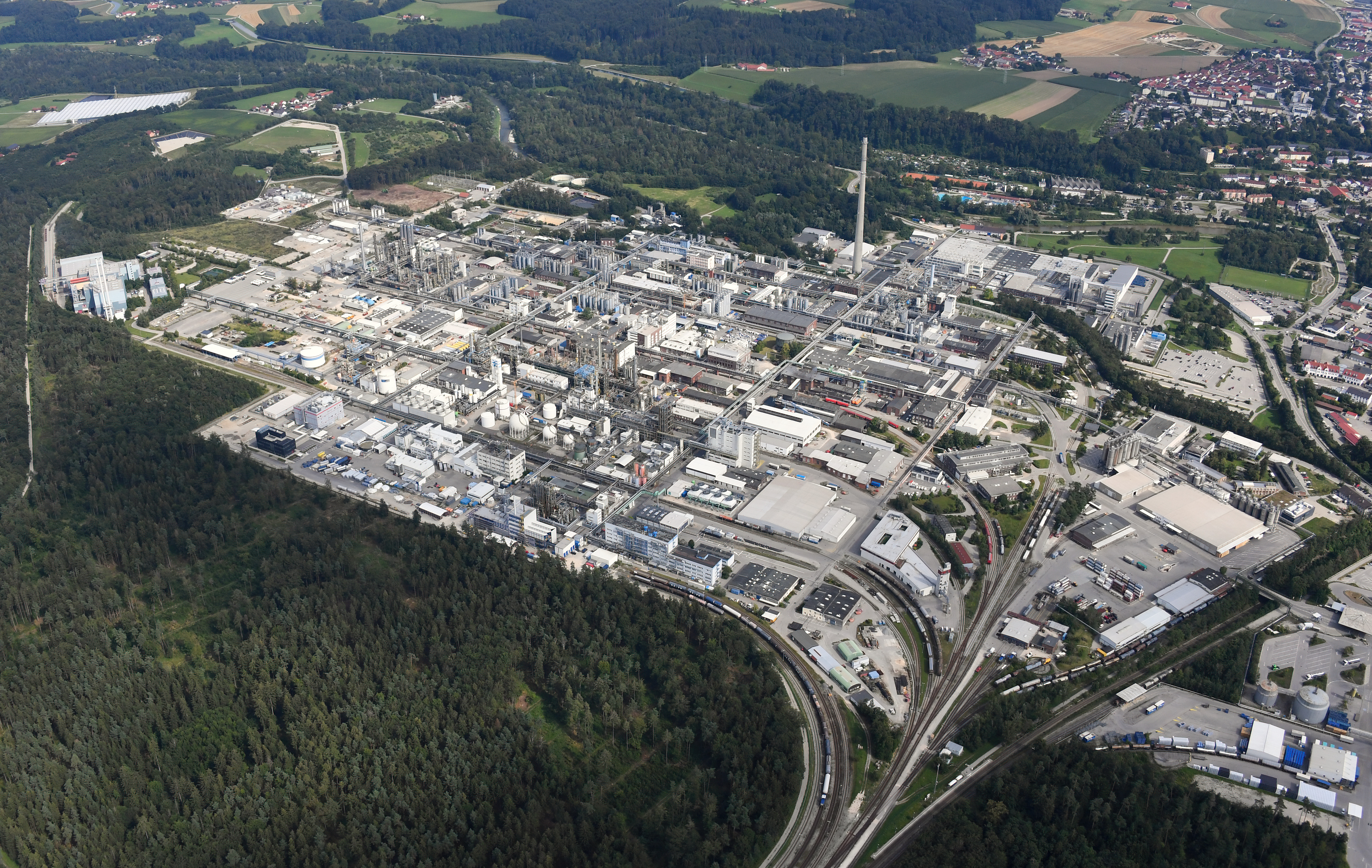
Gendorf in July 2024

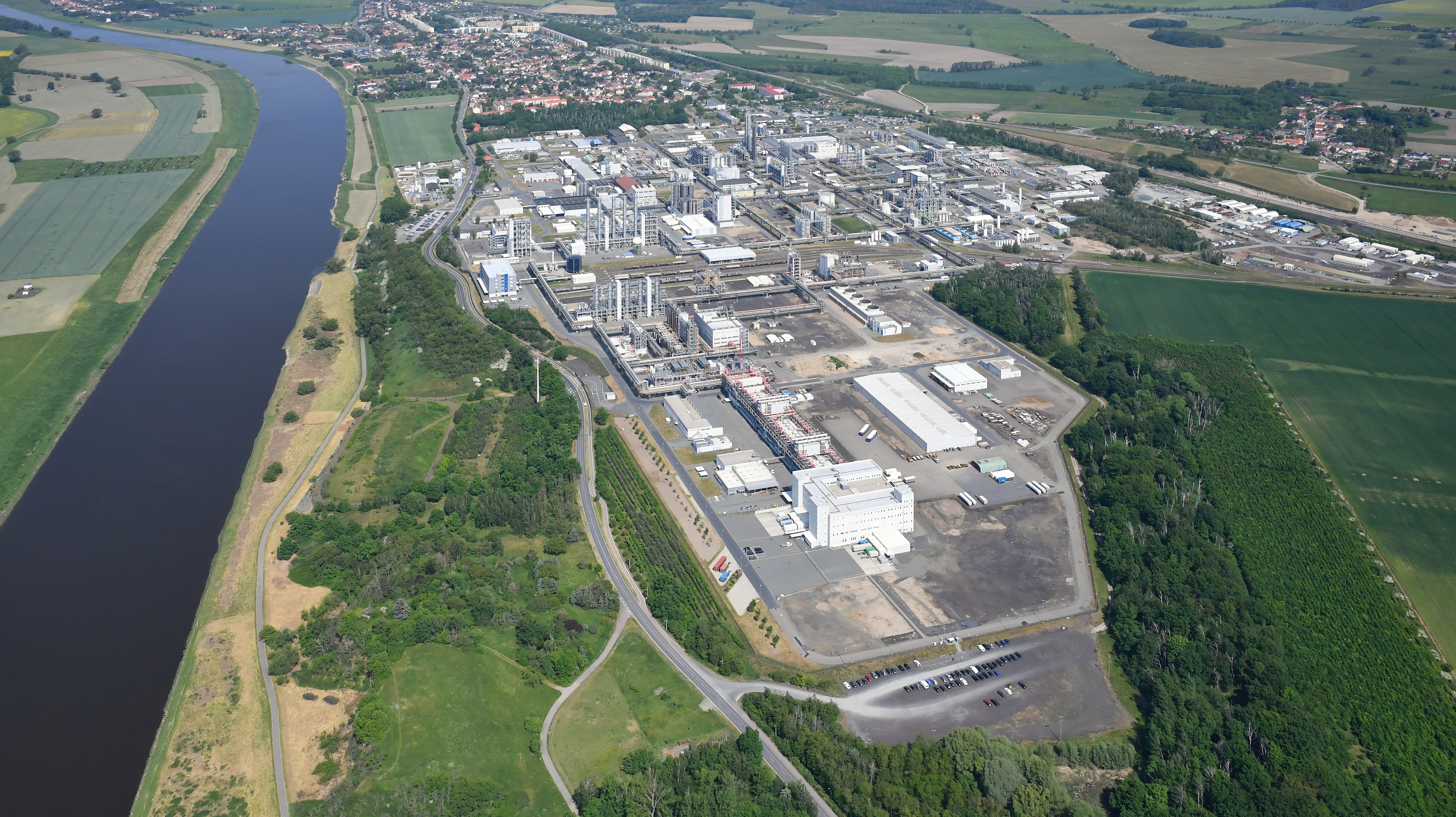
Nünchritz in May 2023

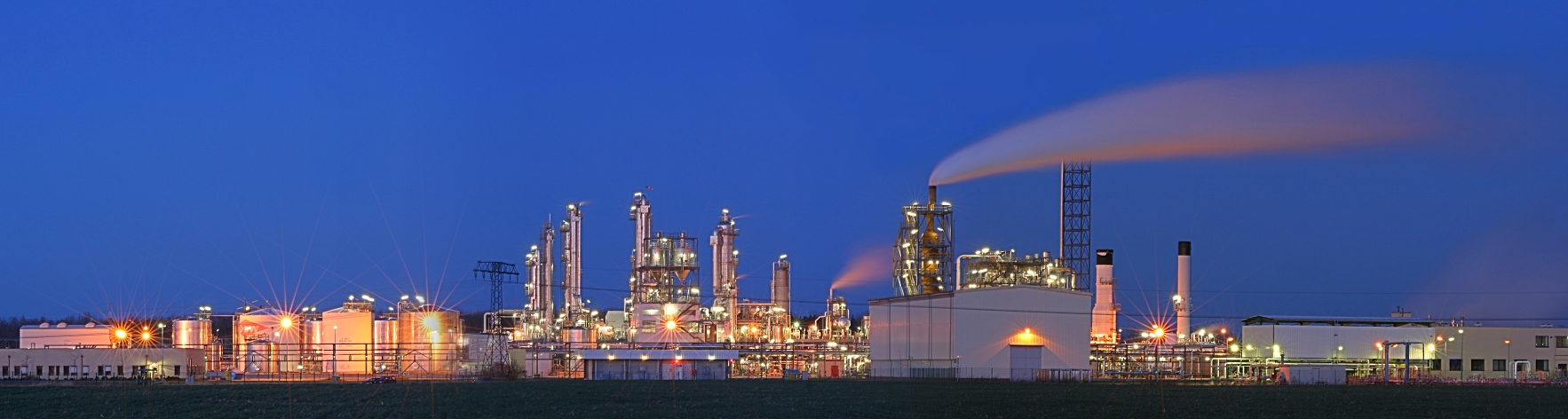
Böhlen in April 2008

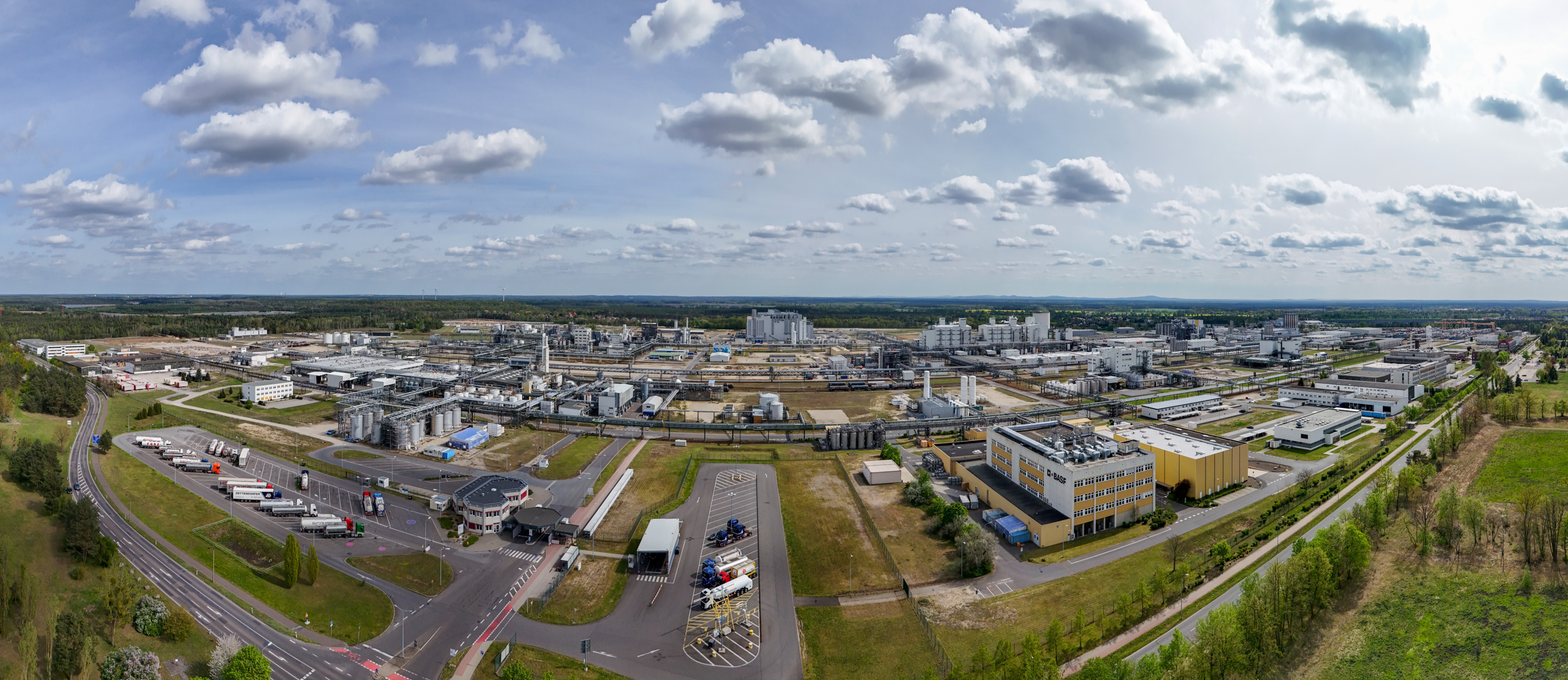
Schwarzheide in April 2024

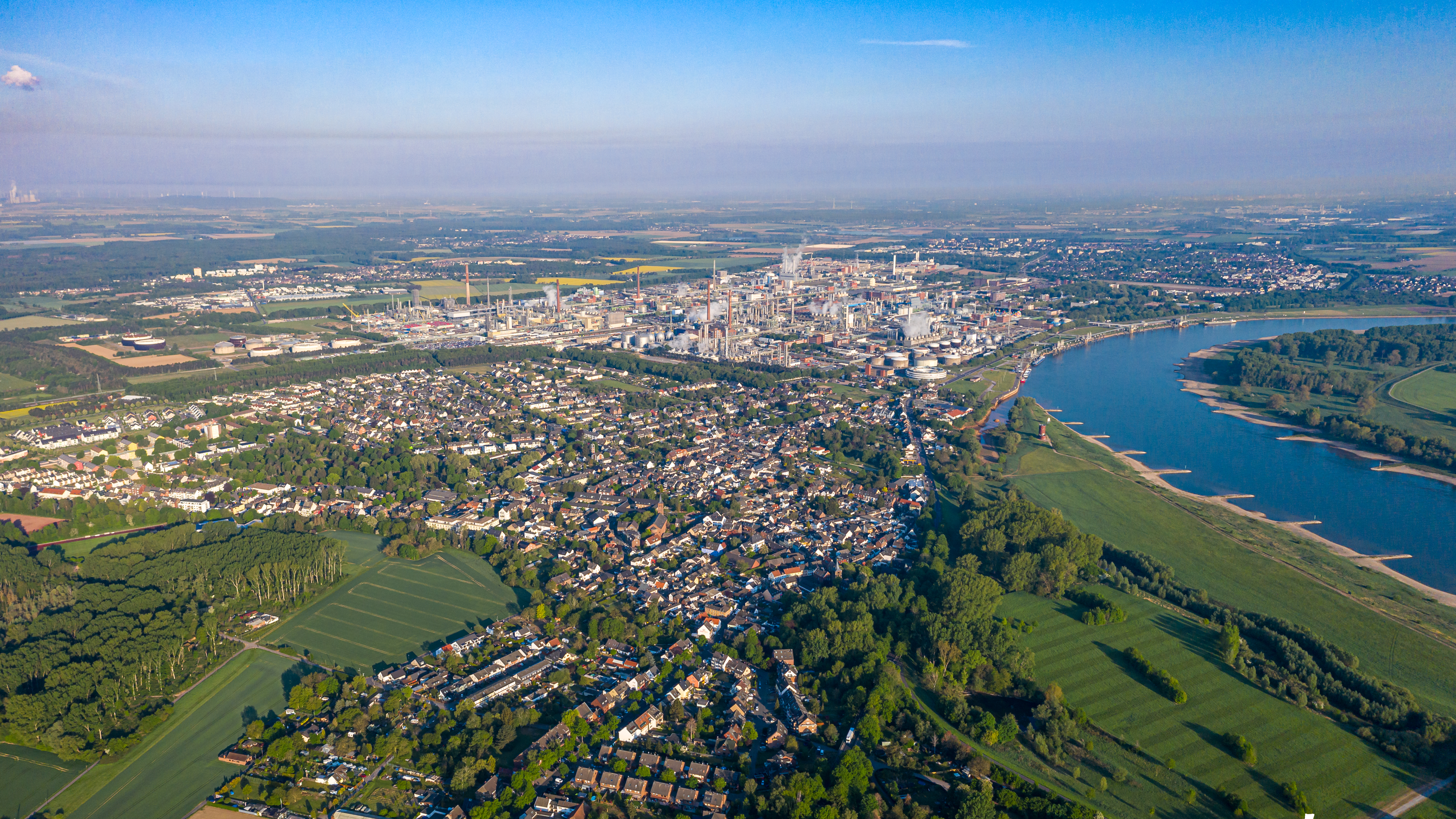
Chempark Dormagen in April 2020

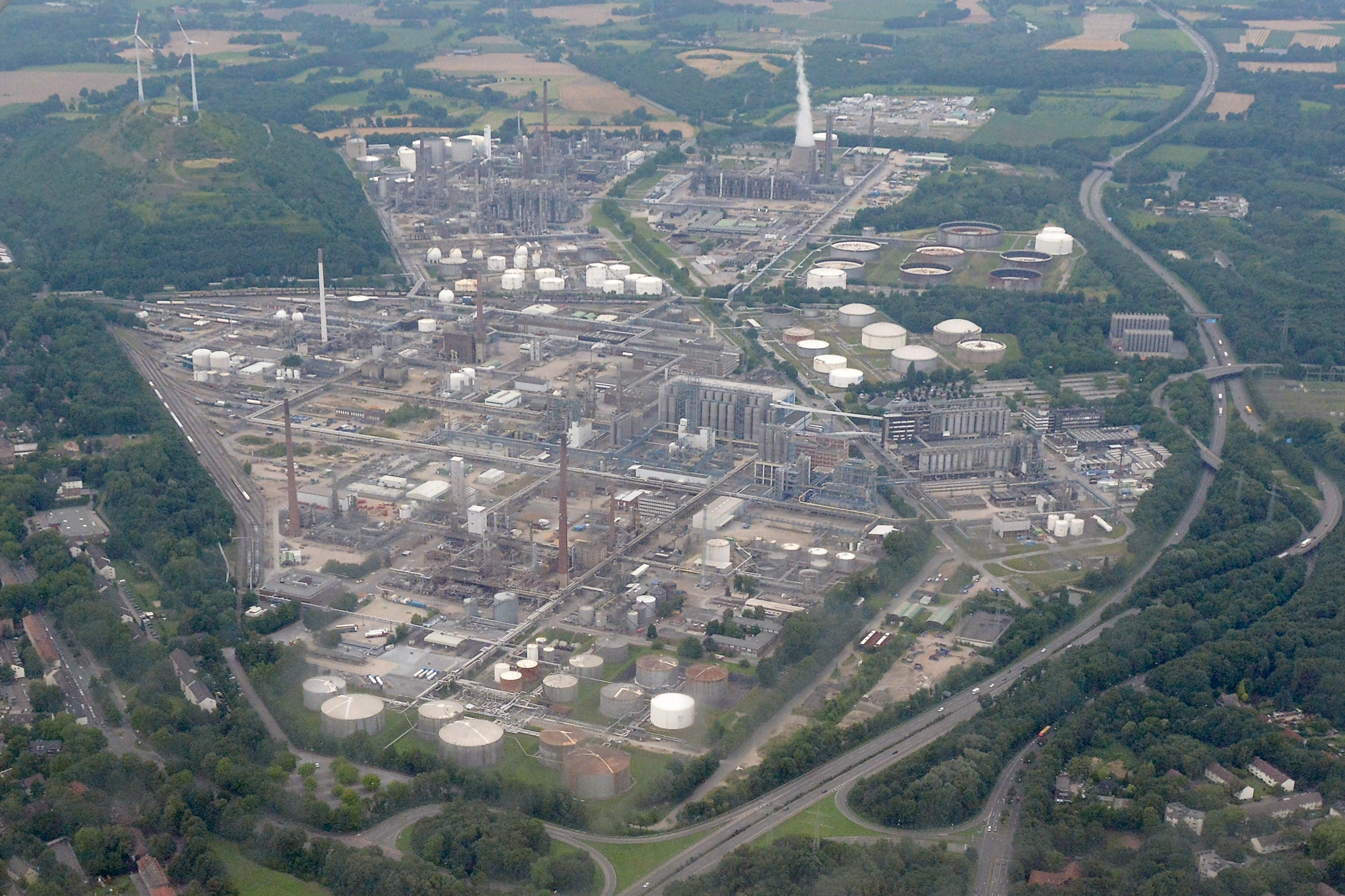
BP Gelsenkirchen at Scholven in July 2025

- Böhlen, Saxony, Dow Chemical
- Dormagen, North Rhine-Westphalia, west of Germany, towards the Netherlands, Chempark, started as a joint venture of BP in 1957, bought by BP in 2001, and by INEOS in 2005
- Gelsenkirchen, North Rhine-Westphalia, BP
- Gendorf, eastern Bavaria, north of Burgkirchen an der Alz, OMV Deutschland and Wacker Chemie, in the Bavarian Chemical Triangle
- Heide refinery, at Hemmingstedt in Schleswig-Holstein on the coast, former Shell until 2010, has a 175m chimney
- Industriepark Höchst, the main site of Hoechst AG, previously known as the Hoechst Dye Works
- Münchsmünster, Bavaria, LyondellBasell
- Nünchritz in Saxony, east of Germany, Wacker Chemie
- Schwarzheide, BASF

== Workforce ==
There are 450,000 workers in the industry, with 400,000 workers for foreign subsidiaries of German chemical companies.

== See also ==
- List of largest chemical producers
