= Roland Claus =

German politician

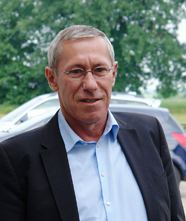
- Claus in 2012

Leader of the Party of Democratic Socialism in the Bundestag
- In office 2 October 2000 – 17 October 2002
- Preceded by: Gregor Gysi
- Succeeded by: Position abolished

Leader of the Party of Democratic Socialism in Saxony-Anhalt
- In office 1990–1997
- Preceded by: Position established

Member of the Bundestag for Saxony-Anhalt
- In office 18 October 2005 – 24 October 2017
- Preceded by: multi-member district
- Succeeded by: multi-member district
- Constituency: Party of Democratic Socialism List
- In office 26 October 1998 – 17 October 2002
- Preceded by: multi-member district
- Succeeded by: multi-member district
- Constituency: Party of Democratic Socialism List

Member of the Landtag of Saxony-Anhalt
- In office 28 October 1990 – 25 May 1998
- Preceded by: multi-member district
- Succeeded by: Constituency established
- Constituency: Party of Democratic Socialism List
Wende politically career (1990)
First Secretary of the Socialist Unity Party in Bezirk Halle
In office 9 November 1989 – February 1990
Second Secretary	Helmut Morche
Preceded by	Hans-Joachim Böhme
Succeeded by	Position abolished
Member of the Volkskammer for Halle
In office 5 April 1990 – 2 October 1990
Preceded by	Constituency established
Succeeded by	Constituency abolished

Personal details
- Born: 18 December 1954 (age 71) Hettstedt, Bezirk Halle, East Germany (now Germany)
- Party: The Left (2007–)
- Other political affiliations: Party of Democratic Socialism (1989–2007); Socialist Unity Party of Germany (1978–1989)
- Children: 2
- Education: Technical University Leuna-Merseburg (Dipl.-Ing. oec)
- Occupation: Politician; party clerk; Economist; Stasi-Agent

Roland Claus (born 18 December 1954 in Hettstedt, Saxony-Anhalt) is a German politician. He was a member of the Bundestag from 1998 to 2002, and again from 2005 to 2017. Prior to his tenure in the Bundestag, he was the state chairman of Saxony-Anhalt from 1990 to 1997. He is a member of The Left.
