= State of Saxony-Anhalt (1945–1952) =

Subdivision of the Soviet occupation zone and one of the states of East Germany

State of Saxony-Anhalt Provinz Sachsen-Anhalt (1946–1947) Provinz Sachsen (1945–1946)
- Subdivision of the Soviet occupation zone; State of East Germany
- 1945–1952
- Flag Coat of arms

- Saxony-Anhalt within Allied-occupied Germany in 1947
- Capital: Halle (Saale)
- Area
  - 1950: 24,576 km^{2} (9,489 sq mi)
- Government
  - Type: Communist state under military occupation
- First Secretary of the Socialist Unity Party
  - 1946–1948: Bernard Koenen and Bruno Böttge
  - 1948–1949: Bernard Koenen and Werner Bruschke
  - 1949–1952: Bernard Koenen
- Minister-President
  - 1945–1949: Erhard Hübener
  - 1949–1952: Werner Bruschke
- Legislature: Landtag of Saxony-Anhalt
- Historical era: Post-World War II; Cold War
  - Established: 17 July 1945
  - Declaration as state: 10 January 1947
  - Abolition of Prussia: 25 February 1947
  - State of East Germany: 7 October 1949
  - Disestablished: 25 July 1952
Preceded by
Province of Halle-Merseburg
Province of Magdeburg
Free State of Anhalt
Free State of Brunswick
Thuringia
Succeeded by
Bezirk Cottbus
Bezirk Halle
Bezirk Leipzig
Bezirk Magdeburg
- Today part of: Germany: Brandenburg; Saxony; Saxony-Anhalt; Thuringia

The State of Saxony-Anhalt (German: Land Sachsen-Anhalt) was a subdivision of the Soviet occupation zone (until 1949) and state of East Germany (from 1949) which broadly corresponds with the present-day German state Saxony-Anhalt. After the retreat of the US troops from the Western parts - following the agreements of the Yalta Conference - it was formed as administrative division called Province of Saxony (German: Provinz Sachsen) by the Soviet Military Administration in Germany (SMAD) in July 1945. The province was a re-establishment of the Province of Saxony which existed in Prussia from 1816 to 1944. On 1 July 1944, the Province of Saxony was divided along the lines of its three government districts of Halle-Merseburg (became province), Magdeburg (became province) and Erfurt (became part of Thuringia). The two provinces became part of the new state including small parts of Thuringia (Allstedt) and Soviet-occupied parts of Anhalt (Dessau) and Brunswick (surrounding areas of Calvörde and Blankenburg). Following the first election for the Landtag in October 1946, the state was renamed to Province of Saxony-Anhalt (German: Provinz Sachsen-Anhalt) on the same day. With the abolition of Prussia in February 1947, it was named State of Saxony-Anhalt. Compared to the administrative divisions of Nazi Germany, it comprised the Gaue Magdeburg-Anhalt, Halle-Merseburg and small parts of Southern Hanover-Brunswick and Thuringia.

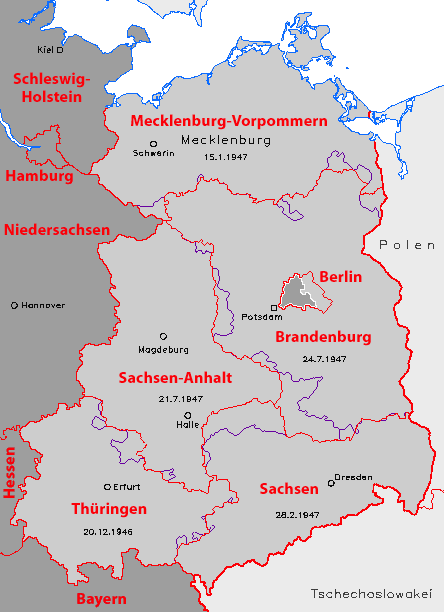
Differences of borders between 1947 and 1990

Due to the post-war situation in Germany, the SMAD appointed state administrations in all subdivisions of their occupation zone in July 1945. Erhard Hübener became the president of the state administration in Saxony-Anhalt and was elected later to the Minister-President. The first election for the Landtag of Saxony-Anhalt was held on 20 October 1946, on the same day the elections for the Landtage of the other divisions in the SBZ had been ruled out. The Soviet-backed SED (which became the ruling party of the GDR from 1949 onwards) received 45.8% of the votes, LDPD 29.9%, CDU 21.8% and VdgB 2.4%. After the withdrawal of Hübener in 1949, Werner Bruschke became the second Minister-President. In February 1947, the state-constitution was adopted. However, all resolutions by the parliament were made subject to approval of the SMAD.

After the foundation of the German Democratic Republic (GDR) in October 1949, a second election for the Landtag was held in October 1950. The only party was the National Front, an alliance of political parties and mass organisations controlled by the SED, which received 99.8% of the votes. Following this election, it became the first and only time that eight members of the Landtag were sent to the Chamber of States of the GDR. As the ruling communists aimed to build a quasi-unitary state, the state was dissolved by a change of the Constitution of East Germany in July 1952. All of the five Länder were replaced by 14 newly formed Bezirke. In case of Saxony-Anhalt, the territory was transferred to the Bezirke Cottbus, Halle, Leipzig and Magdeburg.

The abolition of the Chamber of States in 1958 and two ratifications of the constitution in 1968 and 1974 finally eliminated all kinds of federalism in the GDR until the peaceful revolution in 1989. After the first free elections in the GDR, the five Länder were re-established with some smaller geographical adjustments in August 1990 to accede to the Federal Republic of Germany.

== Minister President (1945–1952) ==
Political party: LDPD SED

Portrait	Name (Born–Died)	Term of office			Political party
Portrait	Name (Born–Died)	Took office	Left office	Days	Political party
1	Erhard Hübener (1881–1952)	20 July 1945	13 August 1949	1485	Liberal Democratic Party
2	Werner Bruschke (1898–1995)	13 August 1949	23 July 1952	1075	Socialist Unity Party
From 23 July 1952 until 3 October 1990, State of Saxony-Anhalt was abolished.
