= Semi Joseph Begun =

German-American engineer and inventor

S Joseph Begun
- Born: December 2, 1905
- Died: January 5, 1995 (aged 89)
- Known for: Magnetic tape sound recording

Semi Joseph Begun (December 2, 1905 in Germany – January 5, 1995), usually referred to as S. Joseph Begun, was a German-American engineer and inventor known for his contributions to magnetic recording, underwater acoustics, and telecommunications.

== Life and career ==
Born in 1905 in Danzig, Germany (now Gdańsk, Poland), Begun earned a doctorate in electrical engineering in 1933 from the Technische Hochschule in Charlottenburg (now Technische Universität Berlin). He immigrated to the United States in 1935. In 1939, he married Ruth Begun, who was the first woman to be awarded a physics PhD from the University of Berlin… In 1943 Begun was Vice President of Research for the Brush Development Company, Cleveland, Ohio. Brush's main business was the production of piezoelectric phonograph pickups, the least expensive and most widely used pickup of the late 1930s. Brush also produced in cooperation with Western Electric magnetic steel tape sound recorders. These used hardened steel tape as the recording medium.

Another product Brush manufactured were wire recorders. These used stainless steel wire, with a composition similar to (or perhaps identical with) high carbon high chromium cutlery steel, which is ferromagnetic, as the recording medium. The recording head was a split ring, with the wire running in a groove in the head, quite similar to the heads used today. High frequency AC bias was used to linearize the recording. The ferritic stainless steel was quite strong. Diamond dies were required to draw it into wire. Dr. Begun obtained a contract from the National Defense Research Council to perform research and development on a substitute for the stainless steel wire. The work was justified by the military use of the recorders and the shortage of facilities for producing the diamond dies.

Dr. Begun had two concepts in mind for a different recording medium. One was to find a means for coating a ductile nonmagnetic metal wire with a metallic magnetic coating. The other was to coat a non-metallic tape with a magnetic coating. He placed the work on wire in the Research Department of Brush Development Company, and contracted with Battelle Memorial Institute, Columbus, Ohio, for work on the development of a coated non-metallic tape.
