= Ruth Begun =

American rheologist and engineer (1912–2014)

- Born: Ruth Weltmann; April 3, 1912; Berlin, Germany
- Died: November 11, 2014 (aged 102); Vienna, Virginia, U.S.
- Education: University of Berlin (PhD)
- Known for: Spacecraft ion engine, Viscometer patent, Violence prevention
- Title: NASA Physicist
- Spouse: Semi Joseph Begun (m. 1938)
- Awards: Begun Center for Violence Prevention Research and Education (Founder)
- Scientific career
- Fields: Physics, Rheology, Aerospace engineering
- Workplaces: NASA Glenn Research Center; Case Western Reserve University; Interchemical Corp

Ruth Begun (née Weltmann) (3 April 1912 in Berlin, Germany - 11 November 2014 in Ohio, US). was the first woman to be awarded a physics PhD from the University of Berlin for her thesis on boundary layers of non-compressible fluids. She worked as rheologist and an Aerospace Engineer.

== Scientific work ==
She migrated to the United States in 1937 with her soon-to-be husband Semi Joseph Begun whom she married a year later. In the same year of her migrating, she started working at Interchemical corporation in New York City. In 1941 (or 1948) she moved to Ohio where she joined the NASA Glenn Research center as an Aerospace Engineer and co-developed the spacecraft ion engine before she was discharged of her duties in 1973. In 1976 she filed a lawsuit against NASA claiming she was unlawfully discharging her from her job claiming systemic sex discrimination.

Although women published before her, due to her well documented publications she is considered the 'first woman industrial rheologist'. During her work at Interchemical Corporation she met Henry Green, whom she worked with closely. In 1944, when Green developed an improved Couette-type rotational viscometer she developed and patented an accompanying recorder in 1945. The flow curves recording mechanism allowed immediate interpretation and calculation of several values plastic viscosity, the yield value, and study the thixotropic behaviour. In her published work she proposed new analysis methods of rotational measurements and studied the properties of colloidal suspensions.

== Charitable work ==
In 1972, the Beguns founded the Society for the Prevention of Violence (SVP) followed by 2001 the 'Begun Foundation' a supporting Foundation of the Jewish Federation of Cleveland, the foundation was dedicated to addressing the increased violence in society.

The Mandel School in Case Western University celebrated The Beguns social work in 2000 by establishing an endowed chair position to support a faculty member working in anti-violence research and education.

== Other ==
Begun wrote her first of book series 'Social Skills: Lessons and Activities for Pre-K' in 1990. Later she co-authored 'Ready-to-Use Violence Prevention Skills Lessons and Activities for Secondary Students' 1998 and 'Ready-to-Use Violence Prevention Skills Lessons and Activities for Elementary Students' in 1999 with Frank J. Huml.
