= Province of Saxony =

Province of Prussia (1816–1944)

Province of Saxony Provinz Sachsen (German)
- Province of Prussia
- 1816–1944
- Flag Coat of arms

- Saxony (red), within the Kingdom of Prussia (white), within the German Empire
- Capital: Magdeburg
- Area
  - Coordinates: 52°8′N 11°37′E
  - 1939: 25,529 km^{2} (9,857 sq mi)
- Population
  - 1816: 1,197,053
  - 1905: 2,978,679
  - 1939: 3,662,546
- History
  - Established: 1816
  - Disestablished: 1944
- Political subdivisions: Magdeburg; Merseburg; Erfurt
Preceded by
| Duchy of Magdeburg |
| Altmark |
| Electorate of Mainz |
| Kingdom of Saxony |
Succeeded by
| Province of Halle-Merseburg |
| Province of Magdeburg |
| Thuringia |
- Today part of: Germany

The Province of Saxony (German: Provinz Sachsen), also known as Prussian Saxony (Preußisches Sachsen), was a province of the Kingdom of Prussia and later the Free State of Prussia from 1816 until 1944. Its capital was Magdeburg.

It was formed by the merger of various territories ceded or returned to Prussia in 1815 by the Congress of Vienna: most of the former northern territories of the Kingdom of Saxony (the remainder of which became part of Brandenburg or Silesia), the former French Principality of Erfurt, the Duchy of Magdeburg, the Altmark, the Principality of Halberstadt, and some other districts.

The province was bounded by the Electorate of Hesse (the province of Hesse-Nassau after 1866), the Kingdom of Hanover (the province of Hanover after 1866) and the Duchy of Brunswick to the west, Hanover (again) to the north, Brandenburg to the north and east, Silesia to the south-east, and the rump kingdom of Saxony and the small Ernestine duchies to the south. Its shape was very irregular and it entirely surrounded enclaves of Brunswick and some of the Ernestine duchies. It also possessed several exclaves, and was almost entirely bisected by the Duchy of Anhalt save for a small corridor of land around Aschersleben (which itself bisected Anhalt). The river Havel ran along the north-eastern border with Brandenburg north of Plaue but did not follow the border exactly.

The majority of the population was Protestant, with a Catholic minority (about 8% as of 1905) considered part of the diocese of Paderborn. The province sent 20 members to the Reichstag and 38 delegates to the Prussian House of Representatives (Abgeordnetenhaus).

== History ==
=== Early history ===
The province was created in 1816 out of the following territories:

- the Prussian lands which lay immediately to the (south-)west of the Havel river; those which lay beyond the Elbe – the Altmark, Principality of Halberstadt and County of Wernigerode and the western part of the Duchy of Magdeburg – had been part of the Kingdom of Westphalia from 1807 to 1813 but had since been regained
- territory gained from the Kingdom of Saxony after the Battle of Leipzig in 1813 (confirmed in 1815): the towns and surrounding territories of Wittenberg, Merseburg, Naumburg, Mansfeld, Querfurt, and Henneberg; within the Kingdom of Saxony these had comprised:
  - most of the Wittenberg Circle (excluding the far north around Belzig which was merged into Brandenburg)
  - the northern parts of the Meissen and Leipzig Circles
  - the Thuringia Circle
  - a small part of the Neustadt Circle around Ziegenrück, which formed an exclave within Thuringia
  - the County of Stolberg-Stolberg
  - the Saxon parts of the former County of Mansfeld (the remainder had been part of Magdeburg)
  - part of the Principality of Querfurt
  - most of the Saxon portion of the former County of Henneberg around Suhl, which formed a second Thuringian exclave
  - the former bishoprics of Merseburg and Naumburg
  - the County of Barby;
- territory given to Prussia after the Reichsdeputationshauptschluss: lands around Erfurt (formerly directly subordinate to the Emperor of the French as the Principality of Erfurt), the Eichsfeld (formerly belonging to the Archbishopric of Mainz), the former imperial cities of Mühlhausen and Nordhausen, and Quedlinburg Abbey.
- several small territories which were former Hannovarian enclaves within the Altmark, centred around Klötze, and which had been part of the Kingdom of Westphalia from 1807 to 1813
- a small amount of territory on the left bank of the Havel that had previously belonged to Anhalt-Dessau (Anhalt-Zerbst before 1796)

=== Later history ===
The provincial arms as part of the Free State of Prussia after 1918

The Province of Saxony was one of the richest regions of Prussia, with highly developed agriculture and industry. In 1932, the province was enlarged with the addition of the regions around Ilfeld and Elbingerode, which had previously been part of the Province of Hanover.

On 1 July 1944, the Province of Saxony was divided along the lines of its three administrative regions. The Erfurt Regierungsbezirk was merged with the Herrschaft Schmalkalden district of the Province of Hesse-Nassau and given to the state of Thuringia. The Magdeburg Regierungsbezirk became the Province of Magdeburg, and the Merseburg Regierungsbezirk became the Province of Halle-Merseburg.

In 1945, the Soviet military administration combined Magdeburg and Halle-Merseburg with the State of Anhalt into the Province of Saxony-Anhalt, with Halle as its capital. The eastern part of the Blankenburg exclave of Brunswick and the Thuringian exclave of Allstedt were also added to Saxony-Anhalt. In 1947, Saxony-Anhalt became a state.

The East German states, including Thuringia and Saxony-Anhalt, were abolished in 1952, but they were recreated as part of the reunification of Germany in 1990 (with some slight border changes; in particular territories around Torgau, which were part of Saxony-Anhalt between 1945 and 1952, passed to Saxony) as modern states of Germany.

The borders of the old province of Saxony endured longest in the ecclesiastical sphere, since the Church Province of Saxony in the Evangelical Church remained in existence until 2008.

== Subdivisions ==
Prior to 1944, the province of Saxony was divided into three Regierungsbezirke. In 1945, only the provinces of Magdeburg and Halle-Merseburg were re-merged.

=== Regierungsbezirk Magdeburg ===
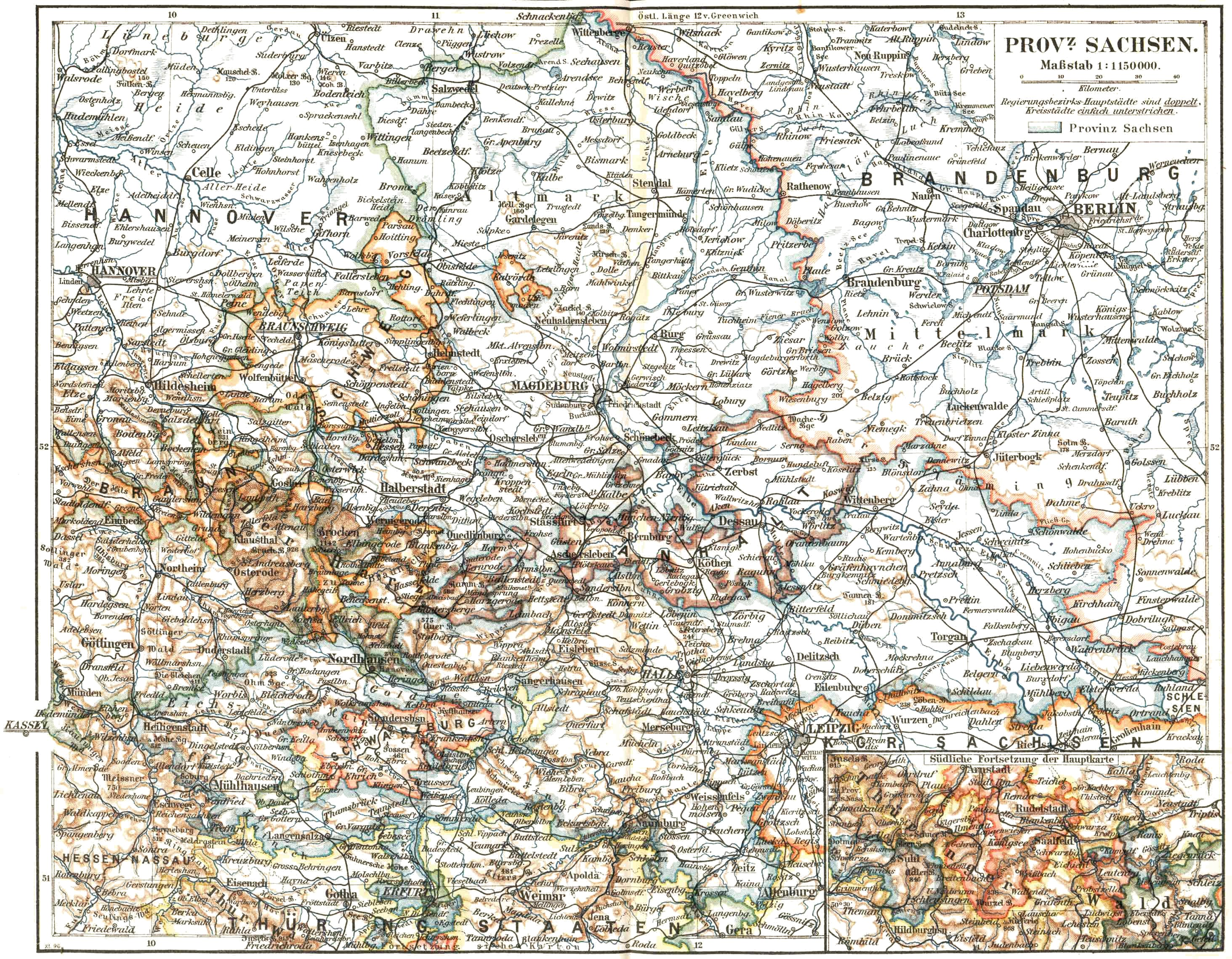
The Province of Saxony before 1918

Urban districts (Stadtkreise)

1. Aschersleben (1901–1950)
2. Burg bei Magdeburg (1924–1950)
3. Halberstadt (1817–1825 and 1891–1950)
4. Magdeburg
5. Quedlinburg (1911–1950)
6. Stendal (1909–1950)

Rural districts (Landkreise)

1. Calbe a./S.
2. Gardelegen
3. Haldensleben
4. Jerichow I
5. Jerichow II
6. Oschersleben (Bode)
7. Osterburg
8. Quedlinburg
9. Salzwedel
10. Stendal
11. Wanzleben
12. Wernigerode
13. Wolmirstedt

=== Regierungsbezirk Merseburg ===
Urban districts (Stadtkreise)

1. Eisleben (1908–1950)
2. Halle a. d. Saale
3. Merseburg (1921–1950)
4. Naumburg a. d. Saale (1914–1950)
5. Weißenfels (1899–1950)
6. Wittenberg (Lutherstadt)
7. Zeitz (1901–1950)

Rural districts (Landkreise)

1. Bitterfeld
2. Delitzsch
3. Eckartsberga
4. Liebenwerda
5. Mansfelder Gebirgskreis
6. Mansfelder Seekreis
7. Merseburg
8. Querfurt
9. Saalkreis
10. Sangerhausen
11. Schweinitz
12. Torgau
13. Weißenfels
14. Wittenberg
15. Zeitz

=== Regierungsbezirk Erfurt ===
Urban districts (Stadtkreise)

1. Erfurt (1816–18 and 1872–present)
2. Mühlhausen (1892–1950)
3. Nordhausen (1882–1950)

Rural districts (Landkreise)

1. Hohenstein county
2. Heiligenstadt
3. Langensalza
4. Mühlhausen
5. Schleusingen
6. Weißensee
7. Worbis
8. Ziegenrück

== See also ==
- People from the Province of Saxony
