= Provinces of Prussia =

Subdivisions 1815–1947

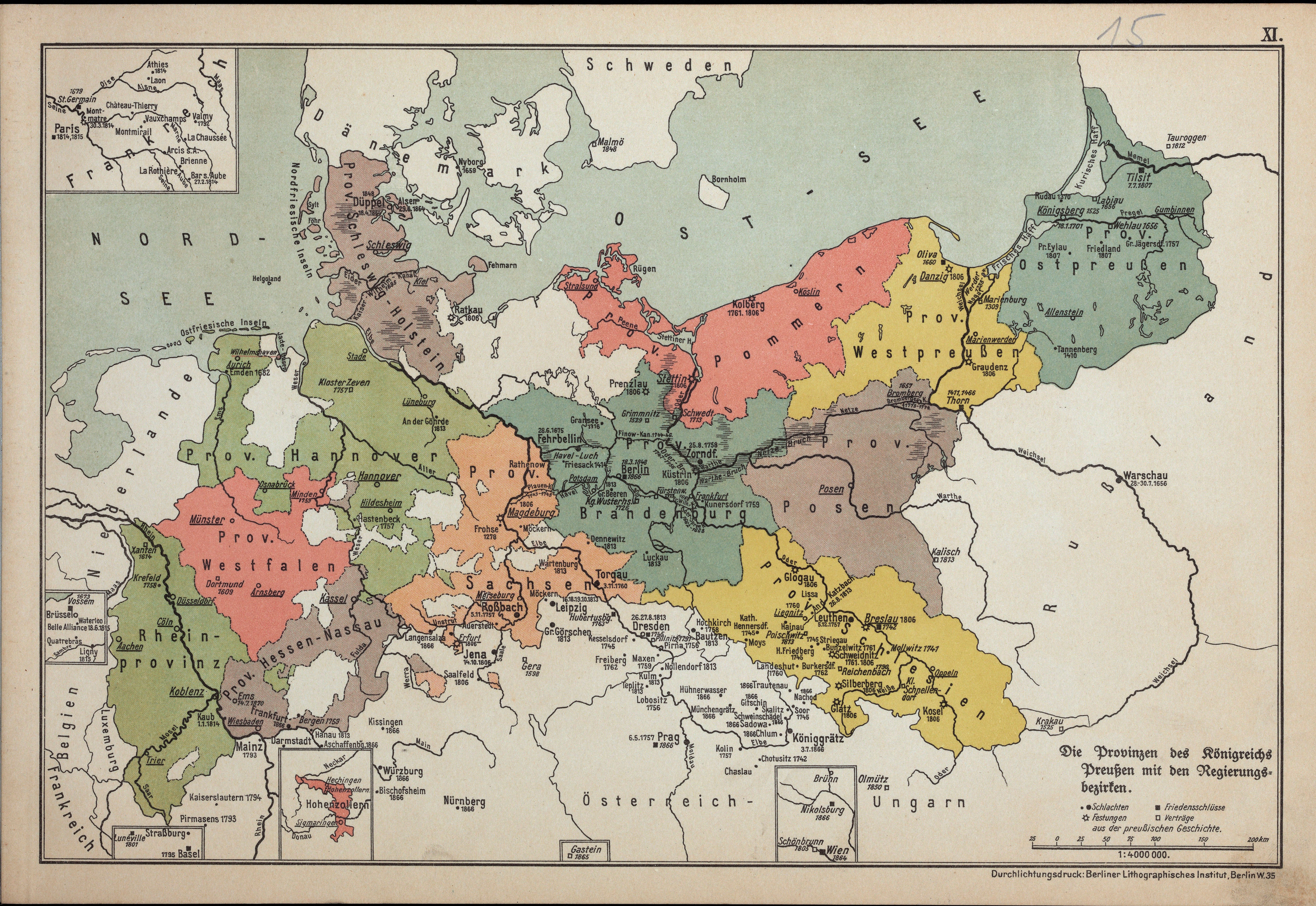
1911 map of the thirteen provinces of Prussia at their greatest extent, which was during the German Empire

The Provinces of Prussia (German: Provinzen Preußens) were the main administrative divisions of the Kingdom of Prussia from 1815 to 1947. Provinces constituted the highest level of administration in the Kingdom and its successor, the Free State of Prussia, until Nazi Germany established de facto direct rule over provincial politics in 1933. The provinces were abolished along with Prussia itself in 1947 following World War II.

The provinces were established after the Congress of Vienna granted Prussia significant new territories in 1815. Initially they were ruled by an appointed governor and an estates-based parliament, but beginning in 1876, self-administration and democratic participation were broadened. During the Weimar Republic, the provincial parliaments were further democratized, and the provinces gained a voice in the Prussian parliament through the introduction of the Prussian State Council. All traces of democracy were lost under Nazi rule.

== Provinces (1815–1947) ==
Provinces of Prussia 1815–1947
Flag	Province	Dates	Capital	Remarks	Location
	Brandenburg	1815–1947	Potsdam 1815–1827, 1843–1918; Berlin 1827–1843, 1920–1946; Charlottenburg 1918–1920	Berlin withdrew from Brandenburg in 1881 and became an independent city.	
	East Prussia	1772–1829; 1878–1945	Königsberg	East and West Prussia were joined in personal union under a single Oberpräsident in 1824 and officially made the Province of Prussia by a cabinet order in 1829. The two provinces were separated again in 1878.	
	West Prussia	1773–1829; 1878–1919	Danzig	East and West Prussia were joined in personal union under a single Oberpräsident in 1824 and officially made the Province of Prussia by a cabinet order in 1829. The two provinces were separated again in 1878.	
	Province of Prussia	1829–1878	Königsberg	East and West Prussia were joined in personal union under a single Oberpräsident in 1824 and officially made the Province of Prussia by a cabinet order in 1829. The two provinces were separated again in 1878.	
	Hanover	1866–1946	Hanover	Created from the Kingdom of Hanover, which was annexed after the Austro-Prussian War.	
	Hesse-Nassau	1868–1944	Kassel	Created from the Electorate of Hesse, the Duchy of Nassau, the Free City of Frankfurt, and parts of the Kingdom of Bavaria and the Grand Duchy of Hesse, which were annexed after the Austro-Prussian War and combined to form the new province of Hesse-Nassau. In 1944 Hesse-Nassau was partitioned into the Provinces of Kurhessen and Nassau.	
	Kurhessen	1944–1945	Kassel	Created from the Electorate of Hesse, the Duchy of Nassau, the Free City of Frankfurt, and parts of the Kingdom of Bavaria and the Grand Duchy of Hesse, which were annexed after the Austro-Prussian War and combined to form the new province of Hesse-Nassau. In 1944 Hesse-Nassau was partitioned into the Provinces of Kurhessen and Nassau.	
	Nassau	1944–1945	Wiesbaden	Created from the Electorate of Hesse, the Duchy of Nassau, the Free City of Frankfurt, and parts of the Kingdom of Bavaria and the Grand Duchy of Hesse, which were annexed after the Austro-Prussian War and combined to form the new province of Hesse-Nassau. In 1944 Hesse-Nassau was partitioned into the Provinces of Kurhessen and Nassau.	
	Hohenzollern (Note: Not technically a province, Hohenzollern was a unique government district subject overall to the ministries in Berlin and, in some matters, to officials in the Rhine Province.)	1850–1946	Sigmaringen	Created from the Principalities of Hohenzollern-Hechingen and Hohenzollern-Sigmaringen in 1850.	
	Pomerania	1815–1945	Stettin	Gained a small amount of territory in 1938 when Posen-West Prussia was dissolved.	
	Posen	1815–1920	Posen	Until 1848 called the Grand Duchy of Posen. After World War I, most of its territory was incorporated into the Second Polish Republic. The remaining German territory was reorganized as Posen-West Prussia in 1922. It was dissolved in 1938 and its territory divided between Pomerania, Brandenburg and Silesia.	
	Posen–West Prussia	1922–1938	Schneidemühl	Until 1848 called the Grand Duchy of Posen. After World War I, most of its territory was incorporated into the Second Polish Republic. The remaining German territory was reorganized as Posen-West Prussia in 1922. It was dissolved in 1938 and its territory divided between Pomerania, Brandenburg and Silesia.	
	Jülich-Cleves-Berg	1815–1822	Cologne	Jülich-Cleves-Berg and Lower Rhine merged in 1822 to form the Rhine Province.	
	Lower Rhine	1815–1822	Koblenz	Jülich-Cleves-Berg and Lower Rhine merged in 1822 to form the Rhine Province.	
	Rhine Province	1822–1946	Koblenz	Jülich-Cleves-Berg and Lower Rhine merged in 1822 to form the Rhine Province.	
	Saxony	1816–1944	Magdeburg	In 1944, the Erfurt region of Saxony was ceded to Thuringia, while the remainder of the province was divided into the Provinces of Magdeburg and Halle-Merseburg.	
	Magdeburg	1944–1945	Magdeburg	In 1944, the Erfurt region of Saxony was ceded to Thuringia, while the remainder of the province was divided into the Provinces of Magdeburg and Halle-Merseburg.	
	Halle-Merseburg	1944–1945	Merseburg	In 1944, the Erfurt region of Saxony was ceded to Thuringia, while the remainder of the province was divided into the Provinces of Magdeburg and Halle-Merseburg.	
	Schleswig-Holstein	1867–1946	Kiel	The Duchies of Schleswig and Holstein were annexed after the Austro-Prussian War and combined to form the new province.	
	Silesia	1815–1919; 1938–1941	Breslau	Silesia was split into Upper and Lower Silesia in 1919. They rejoined in 1938, then were split again in 1941.	
	Lower Silesia	1919–1938; 1941–1945	Breslau	Silesia was split into Upper and Lower Silesia in 1919. They rejoined in 1938, then were split again in 1941.	
	Upper Silesia	1919–1938; 1941–1945	Oppeln; Kattowitz	Silesia was split into Upper and Lower Silesia in 1919. They rejoined in 1938, then were split again in 1941.	
	Westphalia	1815–1946	Münster		

== German Confederation (1815–1866) ==
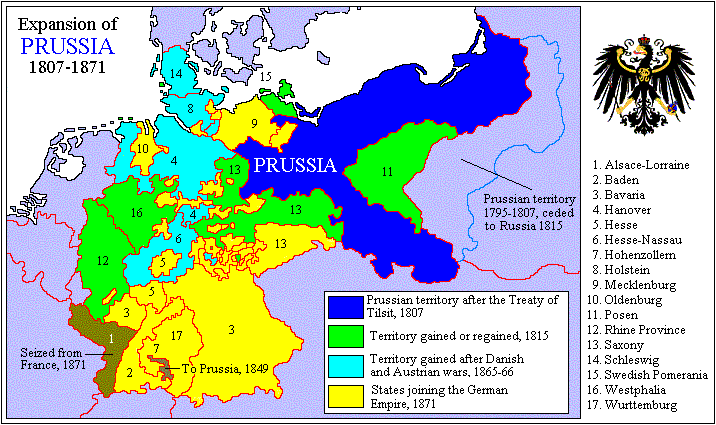
Map showing Prussia's expansion from 1807 to 1871

Prior to the Napoleonic Wars (1803–1815) and the end of the Holy Roman Empire in 1806, the Kingdom of Prussia was exclusively in the northeastern part of what would become Germany. The territories of East Prussia, Pomerania, Silesia and West Prussia all lay to the east of Brandenburg, which was home to Prussia's capital, Berlin. At the 1814–1815 Congress of Vienna, which redrew the map of Europe after Napoleon's defeat, Prussia was granted a significant amount of new territory, part of which brought its western border to the Rhine. In the east, it lost some land to the Russian Empire that it had taken during the partitions of Poland, but it retained Posen and gained Swedish Pomerania and roughly half of Saxony. Its additions in the west, which were geographically separate from the rest of the Kingdom, included parts of the Duchy of Westphalia and the regions that became the Grand Duchy of the Lower Rhine and the Province of Jülich-Cleves-Berg.

The Congress of Vienna also established the German Confederation. The loose federal association initially comprised 39 states, of which the Austrian Empire and the Kingdom of Prussia were the largest. The Prussian territories that had not been in the Holy Roman Empire – East and West Prussia and Posen – were not part of the Confederation.

Prussia's province system was introduced during the Stein-Hardenberg Reforms in 1815. The original ten provinces were Brandenburg, East Prussia, West Prussia, Posen, Pomerania, Silesia, Saxony, Westphalia, Lower Rhine and Jülich-Cleves-Berg. The Prussian government appointed the heads of each province, who were known as Oberpräsidenten (governors). The governor represented the Prussian state in the province and was responsible for implementing and supervising the central prerogatives of the Prussian government. The provinces of Prussia were further subdivided into governmental districts (Regierungsbezirke) that were subject to the governor. The governmental districts were further divided into Kreise and then into townships (Gemeinden).

Each province had a provincial parliament. Initially called "Provincial Estates" (Provinzialstände), they were established in 1823 as representative bodies based on the Prussian estates, such as nobility, high clergy and burghers. Initially there was no Prussia-wide representation of the estates or the people of Prussia, which left the provincial assemblies as the highest-level parliamentary institutions. They had a largely advisory function, and where they were authorised to decide on provincial matters, they were subject to royal supervision. They did not have the right to legislate or authorise taxes. The provincial estates were summoned once in three years. Their meetings were not open to the public and their proceedings could not be published.

Only landowners were eligible to be elected, and quotas by estate ensured that the nobility dominated. Representatives of the third and fourth estates elected representatives indirectly through electors. The system led to marked imbalances in representation. In the Rhineland, for example, where the nobility owned only four percent of the land, they were allotted one-third of the seats. Representatives from large industrial and commercial centers had up to 120 times more constituents than their counterparts from the nobility.

The southwestern German Province of Hohenzollern, created in 1850, was an exception to Prussia's provincial structure. It was subordinate overall to ministries in Berlin, although its district president was equal to the governors of the other Prussian provinces. Many of its administrative functions came under the responsibility of the nearby Rhine Province.

In response to the German revolutions of 1848–1849, King Frederick William IV granted the Kingdom of Prussia a constitution in 1848, which was amended in 1850. It created a two-chamber Prussian parliament consisting of a non-elected House of Lords and a House of Representatives that gave the vote to adult Prussian men under a three-class franchise. There was no specific reference to the provinces in the two constitutions, but with the introduction of the Prussian House of Representatives, the Provincial Estates were no longer the highest-level parliamentary institutions in the Kingdom.

== North German Confederation (1866–1871) and German Empire (1871–1918) ==
In the 1866 Austro-Prussian War, Prussia defeated Austria to become the predominant state in German-speaking Europe. The German Confederation collapsed with Austria's defeat and was replaced by the Prussia-dominated North German Confederation, which had a total of 22 states. Prussia annexed three of the north German states that had supported Austria in the war – the Kingdom of Hanover, the Electorate of Hesse and the Duchy of Nassau – along with the Duchies of Schleswig and Holstein; they became the Prussian provinces of Hanover (1868), Hesse-Nassau (1868) and Schleswig-Holstein (1867). The state of Prussia required them to establish provincial representative bodies (Provincial Estates) on the same estates-based lines as the existing provinces.

Prussia with the outlines of its provinces in the German Empire, 1914

Prussia's victory in the Franco-Prussian War led to the foundation of the German Empire in 1871. It comprised what had been the North German Confederation, three new states in southern Germany plus the imperial territory of Alsace–Lorraine; Prussia's boundaries did not change. With two-thirds of the Empire's territory and three-fifths of its population, Prussia dominated the new state.

A major change to the administrative structure of Prussia's provinces took place beginning in 1876. The Provincial Ordinance of 29 June 1875 divided the provinces into a state (Prussian) administrative district – the province itself – and a coterminous local self-governing body called the Provincial Association (Provinzialverband). It strengthened self-administration in the provinces by putting specific areas such as road building and social welfare under the responsibility of the provincial associations. The ordinance became effective on 1 January 1876 in Brandenburg (except for Berlin), Pomerania, Silesia and Saxony. Similar ordinances specific to single provinces followed in Hanover (1884), Hesse-Nassau (1885), Westphalia (1886), the Rhine Province (1887) and Schleswig-Holstein (1888). Posen was the only province in which the structural change was not enacted. In an unrelated development, Berlin withdrew from Brandenburg and became an independent city in 1881.

The primary body of the Provincial Association was the Landtag, which was elected by the indirect votes of the province's independent cities and district assemblies (Kreistagen). It was to be convened by the king at least once every two years. There was no longer a property-owning requirement for representatives, and meetings were open to the public. The Landtag elected a Provincial Committee (Provinzialausschuß) to prepare and implement its resolutions, which included creating a budget that covered both income and expenditures. The Landtag also elected a Provincial Director (Landesdirektor), initially for life, then after 1919 for six to twelve years. He held executive authority in the Provincial Association, headed the Provincial Committee and presided over a group of Provincial Councillors (Landesräte). At the state level, the provinces continued to be led by an Oberpräsident who represented the Prussian government in the province. Working with him was the Provincial Council (Provinzialrat), which consisted of two Prussian state officials and five provincial representatives elected by the Provincial Committee.

== Weimar Republic (1919–1933) ==
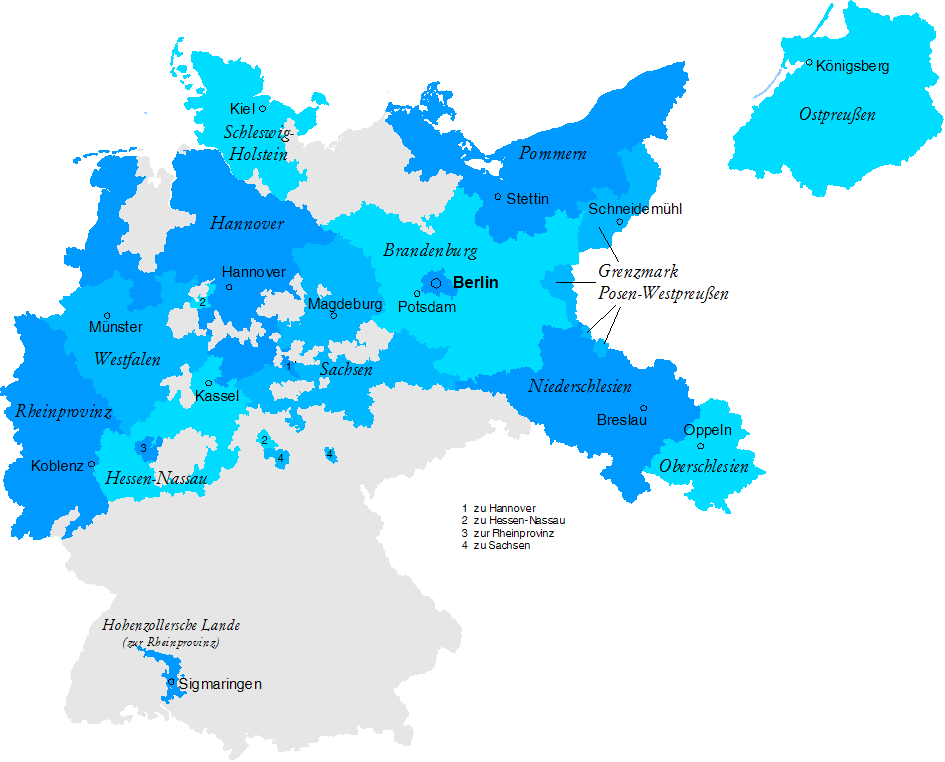
Prussian provinces in 1925

Of all of Germany's territorial losses under the Treaty of Versailles, only a small part of the Saar region (in green, in the SW) had not been part of, or under the administration of, the Kingdom of Prussia.

After Germany was defeated in World War I, the Kingdom of Prussia became the republican Free State of Prussia within the Weimar Republic. Under the terms of the Treaty of Versailles, it lost 55,000 square kilometers of territory and 4.5 million residents. Eupen-Malmedy (part of the Rhine Province) went to Belgium, the Saar region (Rhine Province) was placed under the control of the League of Nations, the Hultschiner Ländchen (Silesia) went to Czechoslovakia, Danzig (West Prussia) became a free city under the administration of the League of Nations, and the Memel Territory (East Prussia) came under Allied administration before going to Lithuania in 1923. Large areas of the provinces of Posen and West Prussia plus a very small region of Pomerania became part of the new state of Poland, leaving East Prussia separated from the rest of Germany by the Polish Corridor.

Some territorial changes were decided by plebiscites. Northern Schleswig voted on 10 February 1920 in favor of annexation to Denmark, and eastern Upper Silesia went to Poland even though 60% of voters in the 1921 Upper Silesia plebiscite chose to remain part of Germany.

In 1920 Berlin, an independent city not part of any province, was extended considerably at the expense of Brandenburg through the Greater Berlin Act.

The Free State of Waldeck-Pyrmont was the only territory Prussia gained during the Weimar Republic. The Pyrmont district voted to join Prussia (the Province of Hanover) in a 1921 plebiscite. Waldeck followed with its own plebiscite in 1929 and became part of the Prussian Province of Hesse-Nassau.

Prussian Regions Ceded under the Treaty of Versailles
Region	Ceded to	Area in km^{2}	Population	German as native language in %
Posen^{*}	Poland	26,042	1,946,000	34.4
West Prussia^{*}	Poland	15,865	965,000	42.7
East Upper Silesia^{*}	Poland	3,213	893,000	29.6
Danzig	Free City of Danzig	1,914	331,000	95.2
Memel Territory	Lithuania	2,657	141,000	51.1
Hultschin	Czechoslovakia	316	48,000	14.6
North Schleswig	Denmark	3,992	166,000	24.1
Eupen-Malmedy	Belgium	1,036	60,000	81.7

^{*} Only part of the region was ceded.

The Free State promoted the democratisation of the provinces, resulting in the provincial Landtags being elected directly by the voters. The 1920 Prussian Constitution provided for a State Council similar to the national Reichsrat to represent the interests of the provinces at the state level. Its members were elected by the provincial Landtags, with the number of members from each province proportional to its population. The provinces were also represented in the national Reichsrat. Unlike in all other states of the Weimar Republic, whose Reichsrat representatives had to be members of the state's ministry, half of Prussia's representatives were appointed from among provincial administrative authorities.

== Nazi Germany (1933–1945) ==
Following the Nazi seizure of power in 1933, the Law on the Reconstruction of the Reich was enacted on 30 January 1934. It de-federalized the German Reich and created a centralized state. Prussia and its provinces formally continued to exist, but the state Landtag and provincial parliaments were abolished and governance was placed under the direct control of a Reichsstatthalter (Reich governor). In addition, the Law on the Abolition of the Reichsrat of 14 February 1934 ended the participation of the state and its provinces in the Reich legislative process. The Prussian State Council, however, continued to exist until 1945 in a much altered form.

Beginning in 1934, Posen-West Prussia came under the de facto administration of Brandenburg, and on 1 October 1938, it was officially dissolved. Its lands were subsequently incorporated into the neighbouring provinces of Pomerania, Brandenburg and Silesia.

Two provinces, Saxony and Hesse-Nassau, underwent significant changes in July 1944. The Erfurt region of Saxony was ceded to Thuringia, while the remainder of the province was divided into the Province of Magdeburg and the Province of Halle-Merseburg. At the same time, Hesse-Nassau was partitioned into the Province of Kurhessen with its capital at Kassel and the Province of Nassau with its capital at Wiesbaden.

== Abolition ==
Following World War II, Prussia fell into all four of the Allied occupation zones, with the eastern portions in the Soviet zone and the largest share of the western part in the British zone. The provinces were abolished at different times depending on which zone, or zones, they were in. Brandenburg, which was dissolved on 6 February 1947, was the last to go. Prussia itself was formally abolished on 25 February 1947 by order of the Allied Control Council, the governing authority of occupied Germany.

For the current status of the former provinces of Prussia, see Abolition of Prussia#Territories today.
