= Province of Halle-Merseburg =

Province of Halle-Merseburg Provinz Halle-Merseburg (German)
- Province of Prussia
- 1944–1945
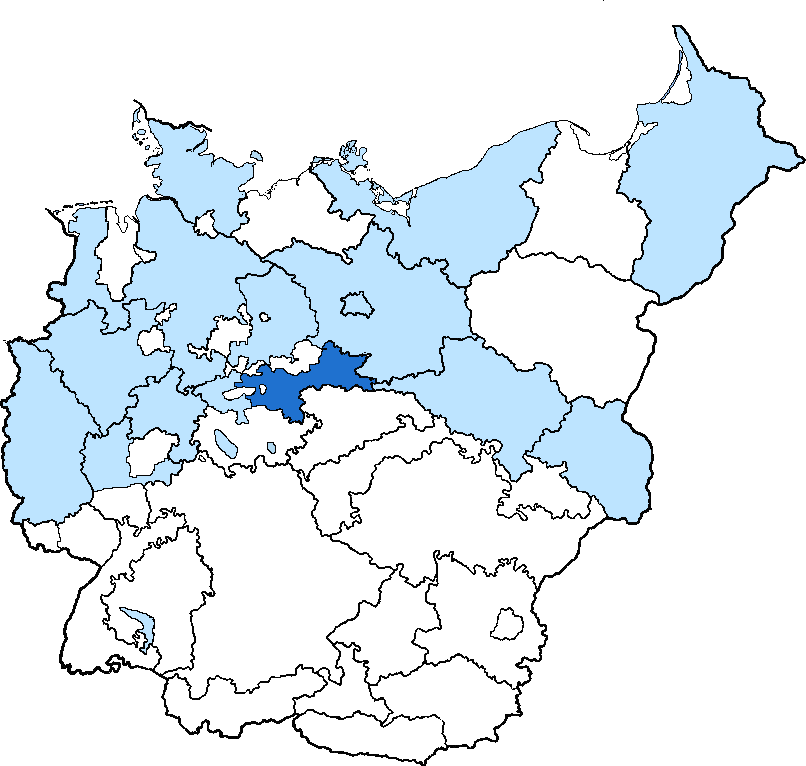
- The Province of Halle-Merseburg in 1944.
- Capital: Merseburg
- Area
  - 1933^{a}: 10,217.26 km^{2} (3,944.91 sq mi)
- Population
  - 1933^{a}: 1.486.274
- Government
  - Type: Province
- High President
  - 1944–1945: Joachim A. Eggeling
- Historical era: World War II
  - Established: 1 July 1944
  - Disestablished: 23 July 1945
Preceded by	Succeeded by
Province of Saxony	Saxony-Anhalt (1945–1952)
- a. Within 1944/45 borders.

The Province of Halle-Merseburg (German: Provinz Halle-Merseburg) was a province of the Free State of Prussia from 1944 to 1945. The provincial capital was the city Merseburg.

Halle-Merseburg was created on 1 July 1944, out of Regierungsbezirk Merseburg, an administrative region from the former Province of Saxony. The governor of the new province was Joachim Albrecht Eggeling, the Gauleiter of the Nazi Gau Halle-Merseburg. In 1945, the Province of Halle-Merseburg was dissolved into a recreated Province of Saxony.

== Districts in 1945 ==
=== Urban districts ===
1. Eisleben
2. Halle
3. Merseburg
4. Naumburg
5. Weißenfels
6. Lutherstadt Wittenberg
7. Zeitz

=== Rural districts ===
1. Bitterfeld
2. Delitzsch
3. Eckartsberga (seat: Kölleda)
4. Liebenwerda (seat: Bad Liebenwerda)
5. Mansfelder Gebirgskreis (seat: Mansfeld)
6. Mansfelder Seekreis (seat: Eisleben)
7. Merseburg
8. Querfurt
9. Saalkreis (seat: Halle)
10. Sangerhausen
11. Schweinitz (seat: Herzberg)
12. Torgau
13. Weißenfels
14. Wittenberg
15. Zeitz
