= Departments of the Central Committee of the Socialist Unity Party of Germany =

Policymaking departments of East Germany

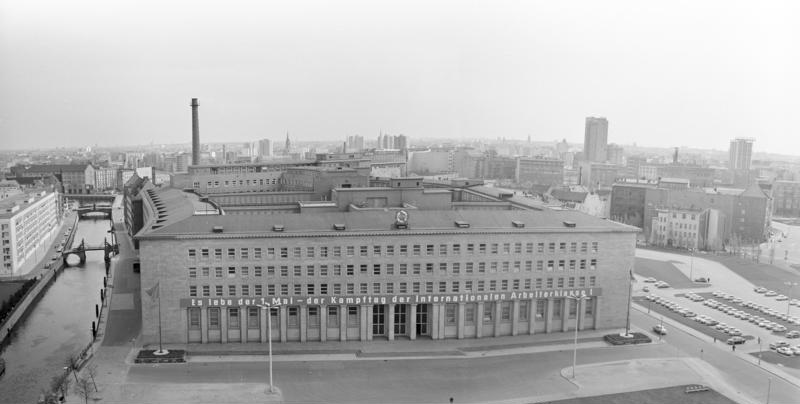
The building of the Central Committee of the SED in April 1967

The approximately 40 departments of the Central Committee of the Socialist Unity Party of Germany (SED) were the center of the policymaking in East Germany, officially known as the German Democratic Republic (GDR).

The departments and institutions whose heads held department head rank were assigned to the ten Central Committee Secretaries as well as the General Secretary directly. Each department was headed by a department head and most had one or more deputy department heads. Each department was in turn divided into sectors with sector heads, political as well as technical employees and instructors. There were around 900 political employees and 1,100 technical employees, a category that included administrative clerks, secretaries and support staff and even the physicians at the Central Committee's polyclinic. While the Central Committee apparatus in total had around 1,000 employees in 1970, by 1987 that number had grown to 2,000 employees.

Only the Central Committee Secretaries had the authority to issue legally binding orders to the respective Ministry, but in practice, the department and sector heads made the decisions.

During the Peaceful Revolution, the Presidium of the Party Executive of the SED-PDS dissolved the departments of the Central Committee of the SED, effective 31 December 1989.

== Policy departments ==
=== Agriculture ===
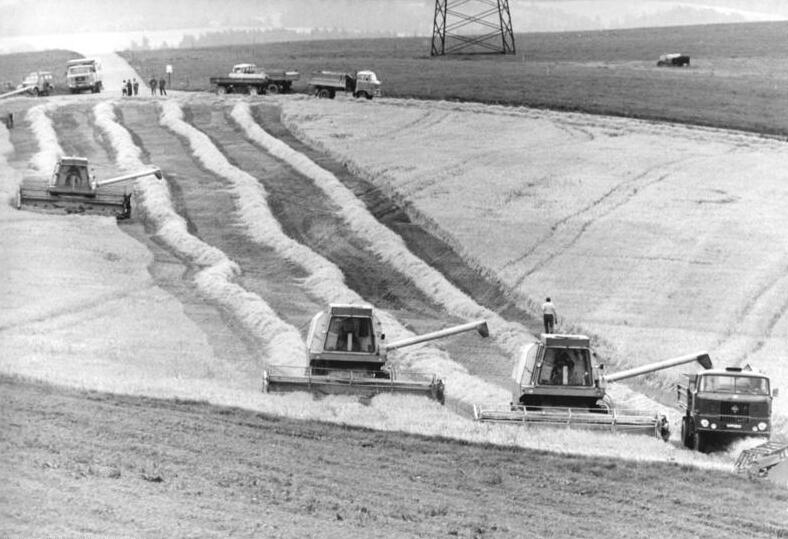
Grain harvest of the LPG Neukirchen in Bezirk Karl-Marx-Stadt in August 1984

The Agriculture Department (German: Abteilung Landwirtschaft) set agricultural policy. It controlled the Ministry for Agriculture, Forestry and Food, which in turn oversaw the country's agricultural production cooperatives (LPGs), the Academy of Agricultural Sciences of the GDR in Berlin and the mass organizations Peasants Mutual Aid Association (VdgB) and Association of Gardeners, Settlers, and Animal Breeders (VKSK), all of which were led by SED cadres. It was one of the most powerful departments, as the SED made substantial changes to East Germany's agricultural sector, namely expropriating landowners, the forced collectivization and the separation of animal and plant production. By the mid-1950s, the department already employed 45 political and 7 technical staff.

The Agriculture Department was already set up in August 1945 in the Central Committee of the KPD and existed almost continuously with the exception of 1950 to 1951, when it was a sector of the Economic Policy Department.

Heads of the Agriculture Department
| Department Head | Tenure |
|---|---|
| Rudolf Reuter | 1946–1949 |
| Ernst Hansch | 1950 |
integrated into Economic Policy Department
reestablished
| Walter Krebaum | 1951 |
| Albert Schäfer | 1951–1953 |
| Fritz Hecht | 1953–1954 |
| Franz Mellenthin | 1954–1958 |
| Wolfgang Parske | 1958–1959 |
| Karl Götz | 1959 |
| Bruno Kiesler | 1959–1981 |
| Bruno Lietz | 1981–1982 |
| Helmut Semmelmann | 1982–1989 |

Deputy department heads include Karl-Heinz Bartsch (1960–1962), Erich Rübensam (1960–1965), Heinz Besser, Wolfgang Mühlstädt, Christoph Ostmann and Heinz Drescher.

=== Agitation ===
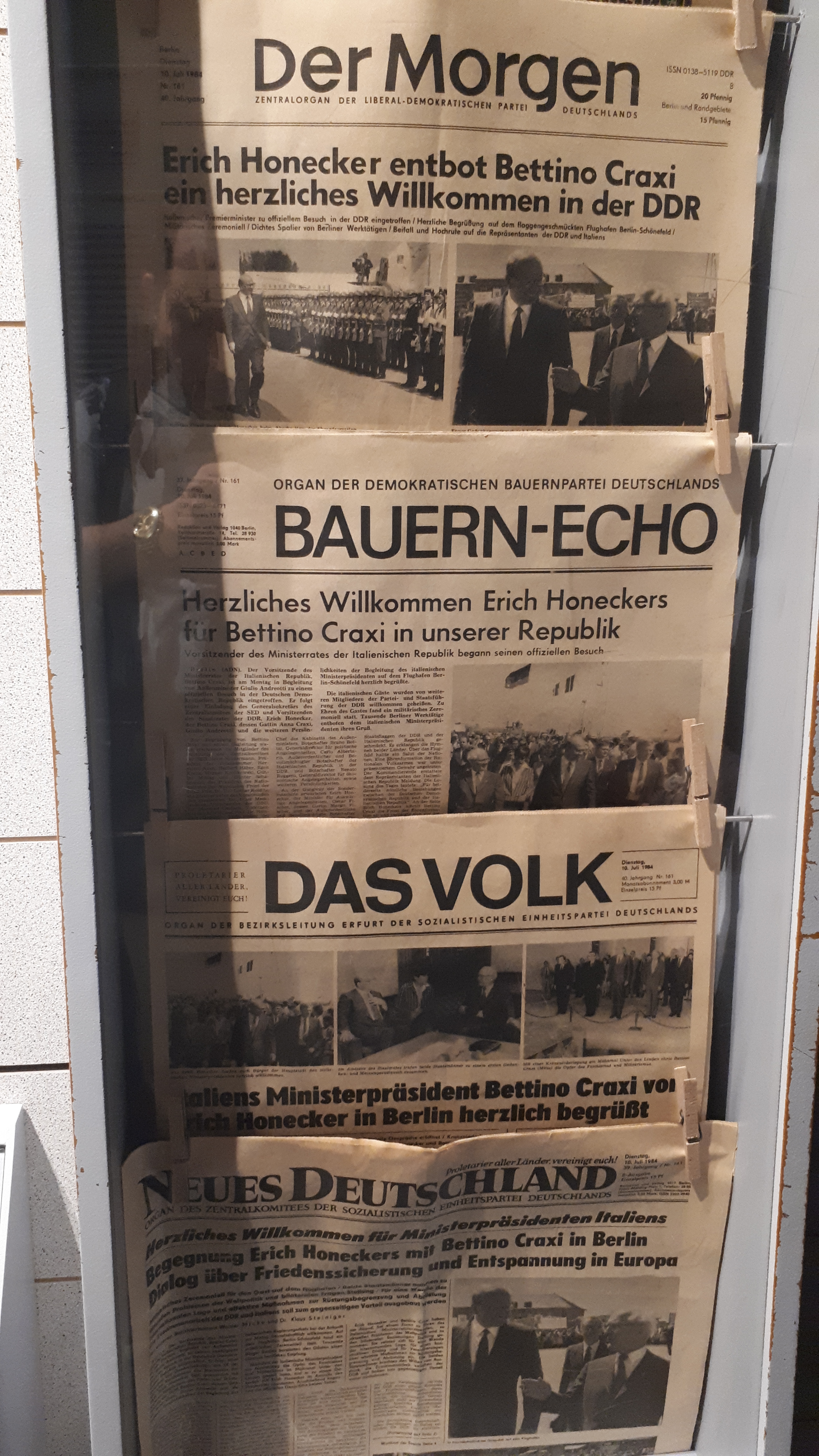
Several East German newspapers from 10 July 1984, having almost identical wording

The Agitation Department (German: Abteilung Agitation) ("agitation" in communist terminology having a similar meaning to "propaganda" colloquially, namely "mass influence") was mainly tasked with aligning East German press with the political line of the SED.

Most large newspapers were under direct ownership of the party as Zentralorgan of the Central Committee (the Neues Deutschland) or the Bezirk party leaderships (for example the Lausitzer Rundschau was the Bezirk Cottbus SED's newspaper), or were published by SED-dominated mass organizations (the most notable ones being the Free German Youth's Junge Welt and the FDGB's Tribüne) but the Agitation Department also oversaw the Association of Journalists of the GDR, the Deutscher Fernsehfunk, the Rundfunk der DDR, and the Allgemeiner Deutscher Nachrichtendienst (ADN), the later often directly publishing Central Committee statements.

The Neues Deutschland was, however, directly subordinate to the General Secretary since 1971, holding department rank itself.

The most important way the Agitation Department controlled and censored the press was with the so-called "argumentation sessions" (German: Argumentationssitzungen) (Argus), held every Thursday morning in the Central Committee building, where 60 to 80 press representatives were instructed in detail on how to report. These "Donnerstag-Argus" were first introduced by department head Hans Modrow, editors-in-chief previously getting instructions via telegram. The bloc parties' newspapers (i. e. the Der Morgen was the newspaper of the Liberal Democratic Party of Germany) were controlled indirectly through the Council of Ministers' Press Office, a representative of which was a permanent Argus guest.

Another important avenue of the Agitation Department's control over East German press was that it assigned graduates of the journalism section at the Karl Marx University, the only university course for training as a journalist in the GDR, to the different newspapers.

By the 1980s, the SED's control over East German press had increased to a point where Erich Honecker and Agitation Secretary Joachim Herrmann regularly edited East German press in minute detail, rewording headlines and rearranging pictures in Neues Deutschland, writing anonymous opinion columns and rearranging news segments in Aktuelle Kamera, the flagship television newscast. The most famous example of this is came on the brink of the Peaceful Revolution, when Honecker personally added "One should therefore not shed a tear for them" to an ADN opinion column on the wave of refugees in the summer of 1989.

The department consisted of the sectors print media, radio and television, and mass agitation by 1968. An additional sector responsible for foreign journalists was established later. The print media sector was the largest with ten political employees, whereas the radio and television sector only had four. That being said, the department mainly exerted its indirectly through choosing ideologically reliable cadres for the media apparatus, and less through direct control of their work, which would not have been possible on the scale of East German media.

By early 1989, the department had grown to eight sectors with a total of 39 political employees. The department consisted of the sectors print media, radio and television, "work with foreign correspondents in the GDR" and general agitation. In addition, the editorial team of "Was und wie", the department's monthly periodical, the library and the newspaper archive were organized as sectors, though they were not involved in media control. The same applies to the "B-sector", which was led by National People's Army Oberst Kurt Langnese and tasked with preparing mobilization.

The Agitation Department was originally created in 1946 as Press, Broadcasting and Information Department, renamed Advertising, Press and Radio Department the next year. In March 1949, the department was split into the Mass Agitation (later Agitation) Department and the Press and Radio Department. These departments were merged and separated several times throughout the early 1950s, ultimately forming the Agitation, Press and Radio Department in 1955. It was merged with the Propaganda Department in 1957, but reverted to being a separate Agitation Department in 1961.

Apart from the Agitation Department, there also was an Agitation Commission at the Politburo, whose membership included Agitation Department officials, major editors-in-chief and five full-time Commission employees with the rank of a deputy Central Committee department head, each responsible for broad topics such as West Germany, the economy or agriculture. The actual significance of the Agitation Commission, as a pure advisory body, was low. While originally meeting every Wednesday, it was eventually supplanted by the Argus.

Heads of the Agitation Department
| Department Head | | Tenure |
|---|---|---|
| Bruno Köhler | Heinz Brandes | 1946–1947 |
| Otto Winzer (Note: Co-department head in parity as former KPD member) | Heinz Pohlmeier (Note: Co-department head in parity as former SPD member) | 1947–1949 |
| Robert Korb | | 1949–1951 |
| Erich Glückauf | | 1951 |
| Loni Günther | | 1951–1953 |
| Peter Prieß | | 1953–1955 |
| Horst Sindermann | | 1955–1963 (Note: As head of the Agitation and Propaganda Department from 1957 to 1961) |
| Rudi Singer | | 1963–1966 |
| Werner Lamberz | | 1966–1971 |
| Hans Modrow | | 1971–1973 |
| Heinz Geggel | | 1973–1989 |

Deputy department heads include future State Broadcasting Committee chairman Reginald Grimmer (1955–1962), Frank-Joachim Herrmann (1963–1968), and Eberhard Fensch (1968–1989), both as deputy heads responsible for the Rundfunk der DDR and the Deutscher Fernsehfunk, Werner Felfe (1965–1966), Günter Fischer (at least from 1967 to 1978), Hans-Joachim Kobert (c. 1970–1989), responsible for the foreign journalists, Herbert Malcherek (at least from 1966 to 1981), future ADN general director Günter Pötschke (1974–1977), Klaus Raddatz (1977–1984), thereafter deputy chairman of the State Broadcasting Committee, and Dieter Langguth (1984–1989), all three as successive deputy heads responsible for the print media sector, Volkmar Stanke (at least from 1980 to 1981), and Erwin Müller (c. 1989).

Otto Reinhold (1956–1961) and, briefly in 1961, Kurt Tiedke were deputy heads of the Agitation and Propaganda Department, Tiedke becoming head of the demerged Propaganda Department later that year.

==== Peaceful Revolution ====
After Egon Krenz came to power during the Peaceful Revolution, Günter Schabowski, the new Central Committee Secretary responsible for Agitation, instituted a new media policy, ending the party's control over the media. The last Argus was held on 26 October 1989, and the Agitation Department was set to be dissolved in favor of an Information Policy Office (German: Bereich Informationspolitik), but this did not come to pass before the Central Committee's collective resignation in December 1989. The former department's responsibilities thereafter went to Lothar Bisky, in his function as head of the Press and Media Commission of the SED-PDS's party executive committee.

In late January 1990, many former high-ranking Agitation Department officials, including department head Geggel and deputy department head Fensch, were expelled from the Association of Journalists of the GDR as the people responsible for "abuse of the media".

=== Cadre Affairs ===
The Department for Cadre Affairs (German: Abteilung für Kaderfragen) was responsible for the selection, development and training of the roughly 92,000 nomenklatura cadres. This included all SED cadres from the First Secretaries in the districts upwards, including other department heads, as well as the chairmen of the bloc parties, university and institute heads, the head of ADN and so on. It effectively acted as a main department as other departments still had to receive approval for the cadre choices in their area of responsibility from the Department for Cadre Affairs.

This made it one of the most powerful departments, though the department's personnel choices hinged on a security check by the Stasi, which could reject appointments based on something as simple as having family in the West. The department additionally was responsible for selecting who gets the GDR's awards, which were not awarded based on merit but on seniority and fulfilling quotas. In the early years, an important focus additionally was the review of the political activities of SED members in the period before 1945.

The department's work was strongly shaped by longtime department head Fritz Müller, known as "Kadermüller" among employees of the Central Committee, a former Nazi of austere and servile demeanor. Müller's influence was strengthened by the fact that, since April 1979, he additionally was the First Secretary of the Central Committee party organization.

In addition to the department, there was a Cadre Commission of the Central Committee Secretariat from June 1952 to 1989, which was responsible for the deployment and dismissal of political employees in the party apparatus and their delegation to educational institutions of the SED.

The Department for Cadre Affairs was originally created in 1946 as Personnel Policy Department. It was briefly part of the newly created LOPMO Department as cadre registry sector from January 1953 to early 1957, when it was reinstated as an independent department.

Heads of the Department for Cadre Affairs
| Department Head | | Tenure |
|---|---|---|
| Grete Keilson | Alexander Lösche | 1946–1948 |
| Philipp Daub | | 1948–1950 |
| Ewald Munschke | | 1950–1952 |
merged into LOPMO Department
reestablished
| Josef Stadler | | 1957–1958 |
| Heinz Wieland | | 1958–1960 |
| Fritz Müller | | 1960–1989 |

Deputy department heads include Gerhard Heidenreich (1950), Horst Wagner (1957–1969), former department head Heinz Wieland (1957–1976), and Horst Conrad (c. 1981).

=== Church Affairs ===
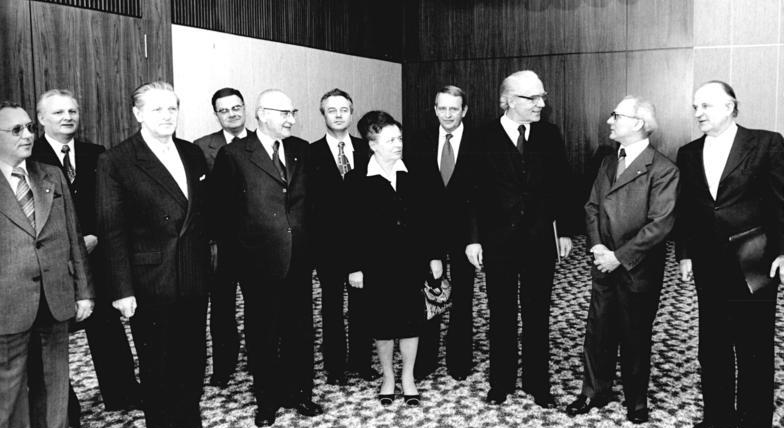
Longtime department head Rudi Bellmann (left) at a meeting of church representatives, including Manfred Stolpe (left of center), with Erich Honecker in March 1978

The Church Affairs Working Group (German: Arbeitsgruppe Kirchenfragen) was tasked with implementing the SED's church policy of state atheism, gathering information about the stances and finances of and potential oppositional movements in the GDR's churches.

The working group originated in the Culture and Education Department, where a "Unit for Church, Christianity, and Religion" was set up in March 1947. As part of an increasing crackdown on religion, the responsibility went to the State Administration Department (which later became the State and Legal Affairs Department) in 1949 as the Churches and Religious Sects Sector.

On 24 November 1954, the sector was spun off as an independent Church Affairs Department, with 8 political and 2 technical employees. It was created to provide a check on the eminent state institution responsible for religious groups at the time led by Otto Nuschke of the Christian Democratic Union. Despite being renamed to "Church Affairs Working Group" in 1957, it retained full department rank.

The working group controlled the work of the State Secretary for Church Affairs, and originally East Germany's churches were only allowed to communicate with the government through the State Secretary's office, though the party eventually held direct talks with church representatives from the 1970s. The working group's influence greatly declined during the tenure of state secretary Klaus Gysi, having already shrunken down to just three political employees.

Heads of the Church Affairs Working Group
| Department Head | Tenure |
|---|---|
| Willi Barth | 1954–1977 |
| Rudi Bellmann | 1977–1988 |
| Peter Kraußer | 1988–1989 |

Initially created without the position being filled, Rudi Bellmann served as deputy head of the working group from 1969 to 1977.

=== Culture ===
The Culture Department (German: Abteilung Kultur) formulated the SED's cultural policy and controlled their implementation through the Ministry of Culture, the mass organization Cultural Association of the GDR and publishers. It had the aim of developing a "socialist intelligentsia", promoting socialist cultural creation and pushing back against what the SED perceived as "bourgeois art" and ideology.

The Culture Department was originally created in 1946 as Culture and Education Department. This department was merged with the Party Training Department to form the Party Training, Culture and Education Department in 1950, which in turn was split again in 1952. Despite its name, the resulting Culture Department was still responsible for education. In November 1952, the Fine Literature and Art Department was formed, which from September 1953 was called the Art, Literature and Cultural Mass Work Department. That department briefly merged with the General Education Department in March 1957 to again form a Culture and Education Department, splitting again at the end of the year.

The resulting department, again simply named Culture Department, consisted of the sectors art and literature (which included separate working groups on theater, literature and art schools), film and "cultural mass work" by 1965.

Heads of the Culture Department
| Department Head | | Tenure |
|---|---|---|
| Otto Winzer | Richard Weimann | 1946–1947 |
| Fred Oelßner | Richard Weimann | 1947–1948 |
| Stefan Heymann | Richard Weimann | 1948–1949 |
| Egon Rentzsch | | 1950–1953 |
| Hans Rießner | | 1953–1957 |
| Siegfried Wagner | | 1957–1966 |
| Arno Hochmuth | | 1966–1971 |
| Hans-Joachim Hoffmann | | 1971–1973 |
| Peter Heldt | | 1973–1975 |
| Ursula Ragwitz | | 1975–1989 (Note: Acting department head from November 1975 to March 1976) |
| Lothar Bisky | | 1989 (Note: November–December) |

Deputy department heads include Karl Strohbusch (1949–1952), Hans Schlösser, future DEFA general director Joachim Mückenberger (1955–1957), Günter Schröder, Heinz Kimmel (c. 1965–1970), Arno Röder (c. 1970), Gerd Rossow (c. 1970), Kurt Löffler (c. 1972–1973), Ursula Ragwitz (1973–1975), Rudolf Raupach (appointed 1973) and Franz Hentschel (appointed 1976).

=== Foreign Information ===
The so-called Foreign Information Department (German: Abteilung Auslandsinformation) was primarily responsible for the promotion of the GDR abroad.

Until the mid-1970s, the department mainly agitated for the GDR's international recognition. After that, the focus shifted to the peace movement, as well as foreign agitation and propaganda, which aimed, among other things, at distancing itself from the West Germany. The department also oversaw the League for Peoples' Friendship of the GDR and the foreign editorial office of ADN.

"Foreign information" was originally the responsibility of a sector of the Agitation Department. It was spun off as an independent working group on 27 March 1963 and was elevated to a department on 29 March 1967.

Heads of the Foreign Information Department
| Department Head | Tenure |
|---|---|
| Werner Lamberz | 1963–1966 |
| Manfred Feist | 1966–1989 |
| Reiner Kalisch | 1989 |

Ernst-Otto Schwabe served as deputy head of the Foreign Information Working Group from 1963 to 1965; the department did not have any known deputy heads thereafter.

=== Friendly Parties ===
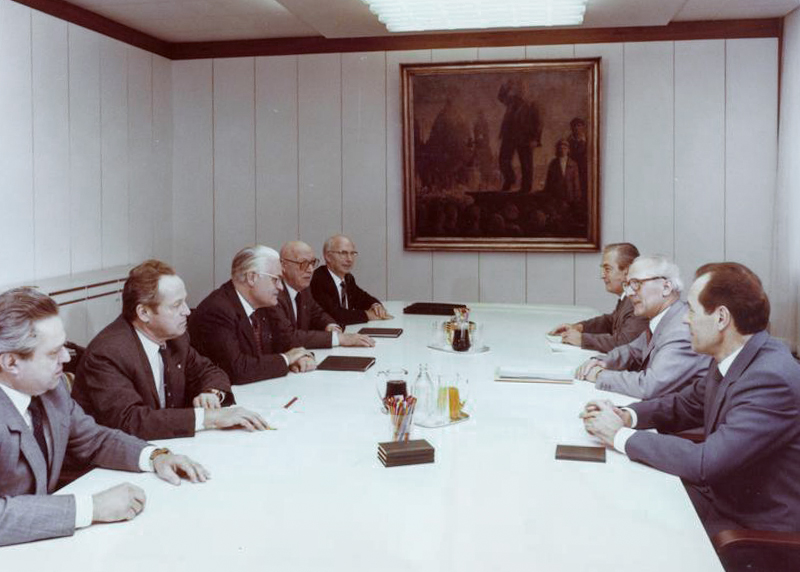
Bloc party leaders (left) meeting with SED General Secretary Erich Honecker as well as Waldemar Pilz and Joachim Herrmann, department head and responsible Central Committee Secretary for Friendly Parties respectively, in December 1982

The so-called Friendly Parties Department (German: Abteilung Befreundete Parteien) controlled the National Front (previously the Democratic Bloc) and its constituent bloc parties, working to ensure the "leading role of the party".

The department originated in the State Administration Department (which later became the State and Legal Affairs Department), before becoming a sector of the newly created LOPMO Department in 1953. In March 1955, the sector was spun off as a working group under the Politburo, getting full department status in 1972.

Heads of the Friendly Parties Department
| Department Head | Tenure |
|---|---|
| Irene Köhler | 1952–1969 |
| Waldemar Pilz | 1969–1985 |
| Karl Vogel | 1985–1989 |

Deputy department heads include Horst Schütze (1973–1989), who concurrently sat on the National Front's presidium.

=== General Department (1946–1984) ===
The General Department (German: Allgemeine Abteilung) was the SED's liaison office to the CPSU, primarily providing translation and interpreter services for the party. All of its heads were Soviet emigrants.

After being demoted to the "General Department Working Group" in 1981, the General Working Group was abolished in 1984 and integrated into the International Relations Department as interpreter/translator sector. This was preceded by working group head and chief interpreter Ilse Stephan being dismissed by Erich Honecker for allegedly being at fault for tensions with the Soviets. Stephan hanged herself shortly afterwards.

The department should not be confused with the General Department at the Party Executive of the SED-PDS, which existed briefly in December 1989 and was set up to dissolve the Office of the Politburo.

Heads of the General Department
| Department Head | Tenure |
|---|---|
| Else Richter | 1946–1949 |
| Martha Golke | 1949–1972 |
| Werner Albrecht | 1972–1981 |
| Ilse Stephan | 1981–1984 |

Werner Albrecht briefly served as deputy department head from 1971 to 1972, when he was made department head.

=== Health Policy ===
The Health Policy Department (German: Abteilung Gesundheitspolitik) was concerned with development of the health care system, the training and further education of medical personnel (together with the Physician Commission at the Politburo) and the medical care of the population. In cooperation with the Ministry of Health led by Ludwig Mecklinger, the department was complicit in pharmaceutical companies, especially West German ones, testing drugs on GDR citizens without their informed consent and selling their blood, gathering foreign exchange currency for the KoKo.

The Health Policy Department was originally created in 1946 and integrated into the Economic Policy Department in 1950. Upon the department's dissolution in 1952, the responsibility for health policy went into the Labor, Social Security, and Health Department, which in turn became the Trade Unions, Social and Health Services Department in 1955. The Health Policy Department was spun off again as an independent department in 1959.

Heads of the Health Policy Department
| Department Head | | Tenure |
|---|---|---|
| Hugo Gräf | Hans Horst | 1946 |
| Hugo Gräf | | 1946–1949 |
integrated into Economic Policy Department
integrated into Labor, Social Security, and Health Department
reestablished
| Fritz Schellhorn | | 1953–1956 |
| Fritz Rettmann | | 1957–1959 |
| Werner Hering | | 1960–1981 |
| Karl Seidel | | 1981–1989 |

Deputy department heads include Rudolf Weber (at least from 1969 to 1975), future department head Karl Seidel (1978–1981), and Christian Münter (c. 1983–1989).

=== International Politics and Economics ===
The International Politics and Economics Department (German: Abteilung Internationale Politik und Wirtschaft) (mostly named "West Department" until May 1984) was mainly tasked with influencing West German politics. It controlled the SED's West German affiliates, namely the Communist Party of Germany (KPD) and, after its 1956 ban, the German Communist Party (DKP) as well as the Socialist Unity Party of West Berlin (SEW). Additionally, it coordinated with the West German SPD, especially on issues of disarmament.

By June 1980, the department had 20 political and 5 technical employees, down from 38 political and 13 technical employees in the 1970s. 5 political employees were assigned to the independent work area "Analysis, information and elaboration", 7 to the independent work area "Political-operational work and coordination", additionally, one political employee each was responsible for the areas of cadres, agitation, press/archive and instructing the Institute for International Politics and Economics.

For the longest time, the West Department existed alongside several other, often short-lived West-focused institutions in the Central Committee apparatus, for example a transient KPD Work Office (1951–1971, mostly dormant since 1960), the clandestine Trafficking Department and the Politburo West Commission, which led to disputes over jurisdiction. In 1965, the Politburo West Commission was converted to a purely advisory board, making the West Department the deciding institution on issues concerning West German politics.

The Institute for International Politics and Economics (IPW), founded in July 1971 as the main successor of the State Secretariat for West German Affairs and meant to research supposed imperialism in West Germany, was also controlled by the West Department despite nominally being an institution under the Council of Ministers' Presidium. Its directors were Herbert Häber (1971–1973) and Max Schmidt (1973–1990), both former deputy heads of the West Department.

Heads of the West Department
| Department Head | Tenure |
|---|---|
| Alfred Zeidler | 1948–1949 |
abolished in favor of the West Commission at the Politburo
| Paul Verner | 1953–1958 |
| Arne Rehan | 1959–1965 |
| Heinz Geggel | 1965–1973 |
| Herbert Häber | 1973–1985 |
| Gunter Rettner | 1985–1989 |

Deputy department heads include future department head Herbert Häber (1965), Max Schmidt (c. 1965–1973), Günter Pötschke (1966–1974; responsible for agitation and later deputy department head of the Agitation Department), Dieter Kerschek (1967–1968; responsible for West Berlin and coordination), Reinhard Klassen (at least from 1976 to 1984), Karl Wildberger (1981–1989), future department head Gunter Rettner (1983–1985), Hans-Georg Schuster (1986–1989), and Harry Morgenstern (1986–1989).

=== International Relations ===
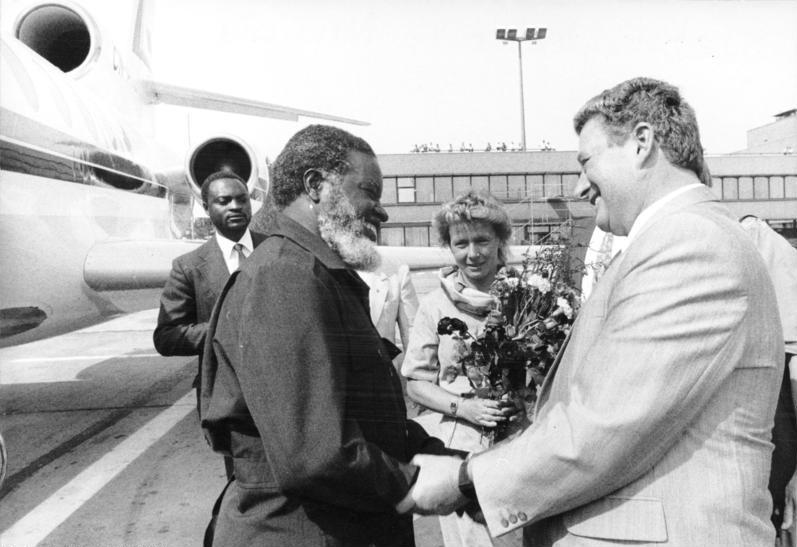
Longtime department head Günter Sieber (right) meeting with SWAPO president Sam Nujoma in August 1989

The International Relations Department (German: Abteilung Internationale Verbindungen) was, together with the Foreign Policy Commission at the Politburo, concerned with coordinating the SED's foreign policy, especially the relations with the 140 communist, socialist and social democratic parties.

All fundamental foreign policy and foreign economic policy questions (in coordination with the Central Committee's economic departments) went through the department, as did personnel issues including ambassadors and embassy party secretaries as well as the granting of government loans.

In addition to the Ministry of Foreign Affairs, the department also oversaw the Institute for International Relations in Potsdam and the officially non-state Solidarity Committee of the GDR, the country's main vehicle for development aid. By the 1980s, it had about 100 employees.

Within the Central Committee apparatus, the department's employees held a particularly privileged position in regards to travel and access to foreign literature. The department's employees had a higher educational background than most party functionaries and were regarded as rather hostile to Erich Honecker. The department was additionally unique in that its employees were not allowed to be recruited by the Stasi as IMs.

An overview of the department's work is given in the 1993 book Die zweite Etage: Funktionsweise eines Machtapparates (English: The Second Floor: Functioning of a Power Apparatus) by Manfred Uschner, who originally joined the department as an instructor, later serving as personal assistant to Hermann Axen, the Central Committee Secretary responsible for the department, and as secretary of the Foreign Policy Commission at the Politburo.

The department was originally created in 1949 as a merger of the International Cooperation Department and the Foreign Policy Department. It was named Foreign Policy Issues Department from 1952 to 1953 and Foreign Policy and International Relations Department from September 1953 to 1963, when it reverted to its original name.

Heads of the International Relations Department
| Department Head | Tenure |
|---|---|
| Grete Keilson | 1948–1952 |
| Peter Florin | 1953–1966 |
| Paul Markowski | 1966–1978† |
| Egon Winkelmann | 1978–1980 |
| Günter Sieber | 1980–1989 |
| Bruno Mahlow | 1989 |

Deputy department heads include future department heads Peter Florin (1949–1950), Paul Markowski (1964–1966) and Egon Winkelmann (1967–1978), as well as Harry Ott (1966–1974), Rudolf Guttmann (at least from 1965 to 1984), Gerd König (1971–1973), former ambassador to Chile Friedel Trappen (1974–1986; responsible for the three "Third World" sectors for Africa, Asia and Latin America), Hans-Joachim Kobert (c. 1976), formerly a deputy head of the Agitation Department, Bruno Mahlow (1973–1989), Alfred Marter (at least from 1978 to 1984), Heinz Lehmann (c. 1983), Edgar Fries (c. 1984), and Joachim Böhm (c. 1984).

=== KPD (1951–1971) ===
The KPD Work Office (German: Arbeitsbüro der KPD) was responsible for controlling the West German KPD, keeping track of the meetings of its Central Committee and Politburo as well as organizational, ideological and cadre issues.

The KPD Work Office was created in January 1951 from the dissolved West Commission at the Politburo. It should not be confused with the SED-KPD Working Group in the SED Party Executive Committee, a working group existing from 1947 to 1949 tasked with expanding the SPD and KPD's merger into the SED in the western occupation zones.

Though the Politburo decided to dissolve it in November 1960, it only formerly ceased to exist in February 1971, to a lesser extent still directing the illegal KPD and the founding of the DKP in the meantime. The office's responsibilities overlapped with the several other West-focused institutions in the Central Committee apparatus such as the West Department, leading to disputes over jurisdiction.

Heads of the KPD Work Office
| Department Head | Tenure |
|---|---|
| Karl Schirdewan | 1951–1952 |
| Erich Glückauf | 1952–1959 |
| Max Spangenberg | 1959–1971 |

=== Party Organs ===
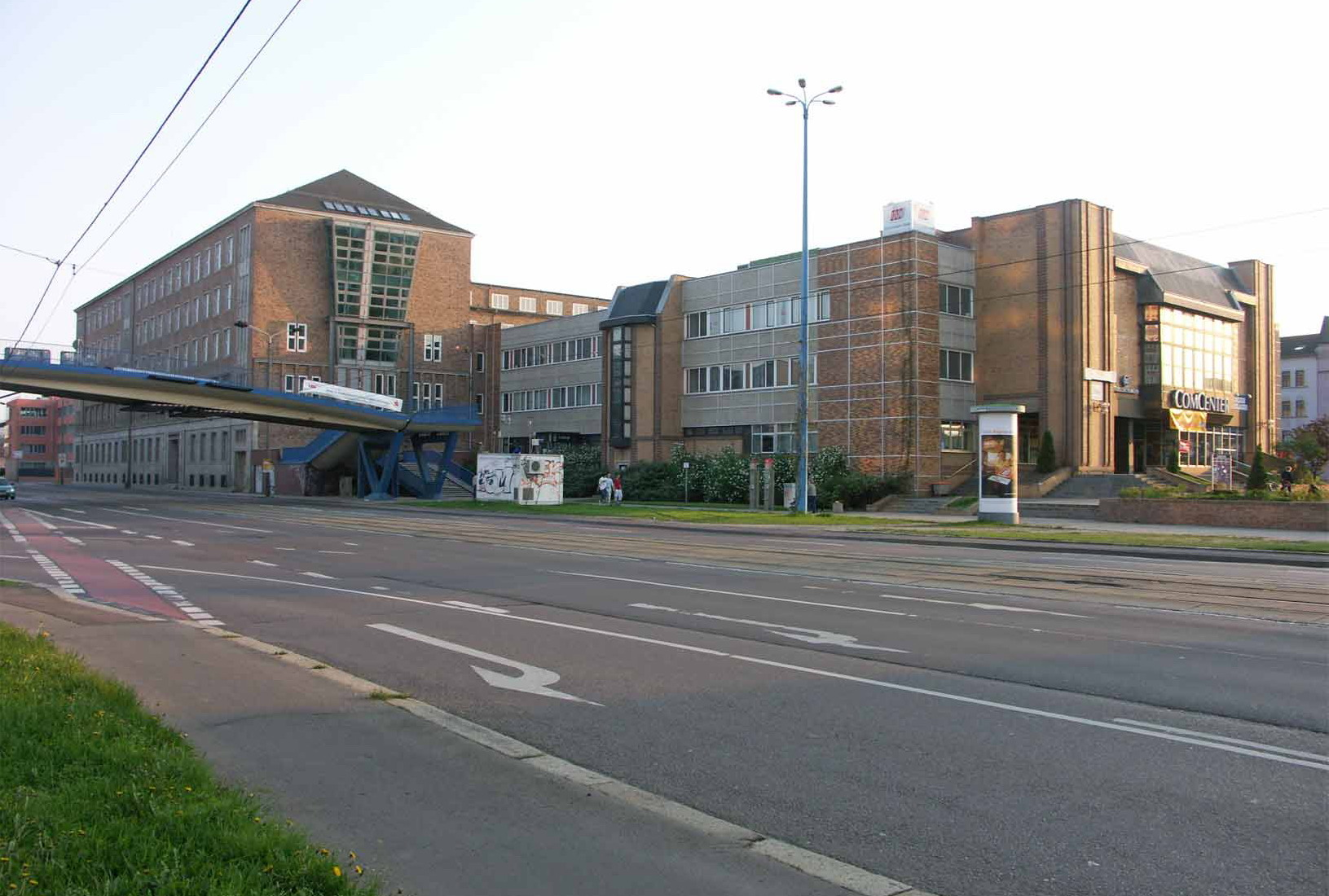
Former building of the Bezirk Halle SED in May 2006

The Party Organs Department (German: Abteilung Parteiorgane) was primarily responsible for keeping records of the party membership and party cadres, receiving "party information" and, preparing the careful staging of party congresses, most importantly, controlling the lower Bezirk, district, workplace and local party organizations. It had a full-time political employee, an instructor, assigned to every one of the 15 Bezirke, among other things responsible for elections. Its role in processing party information, with the exception of information relating to the economy, meant it had control over the SED's information flow. The department played an important role in the SED's Stalinization in the 1950s. In the 1980s, the department was notably the only one located on the same floor as the Politburo.

The department was originally created in 1946 as Organization Department and renamed Organization Instructor Department in 1950. On 15 January 1952, the department was merged with several others to form the Leading Organs of the Party and Mass Organizations Department (German: Abteilung Leitende Organe der Partei und der Massenorganisationen) (LOPMO). This "super department" was responsible for the SED's party organs and cadres, all bloc parties and all mass organizations, including the one for women (Democratic Women's League of Germany), youth (Free German Youth) and the Free German Trade Union Federation.

All of these responsibilities were spun off again on 26 January 1957 and the department was again named Organization Department. It briefly became known as Leading Party Organs Department from February 1960 before taking on the name Party Organs Department in 1961.

Heads of the Party Organs Department
| Department Head | | Tenure |
|---|---|---|
| Walter Beling | Josef König | 1946–1950 |
| Paul Verner | | 1950–1952 |
| Heinz Glaser | | 1952–1953 |
| Willi Elstner | | 1953 |
| Fritz Kleinert | | 1953–1957 |
| Kurt Schneidewind | | 1956–1958 |
| Johann Raskop (acting) | | 1958–1959 |
| Werner Guse | | 1959–1960 |
| Horst Dohlus | | 1960–1986 |
| Heinz Mirtschin | | 1986–1989 |

Deputy department heads include Johann Raskop (1958–1963), who also served as acting department head after Kurt Schneidewind moved to the Ministry for Foreign Affairs in December 1958, future Politburo member Werner Eberlein (1964–1983), Karl-Heinz Steuer (at least from 1974 to 1984), and future department head Heinz Mirtschin (1983–1986).

=== Propaganda ===
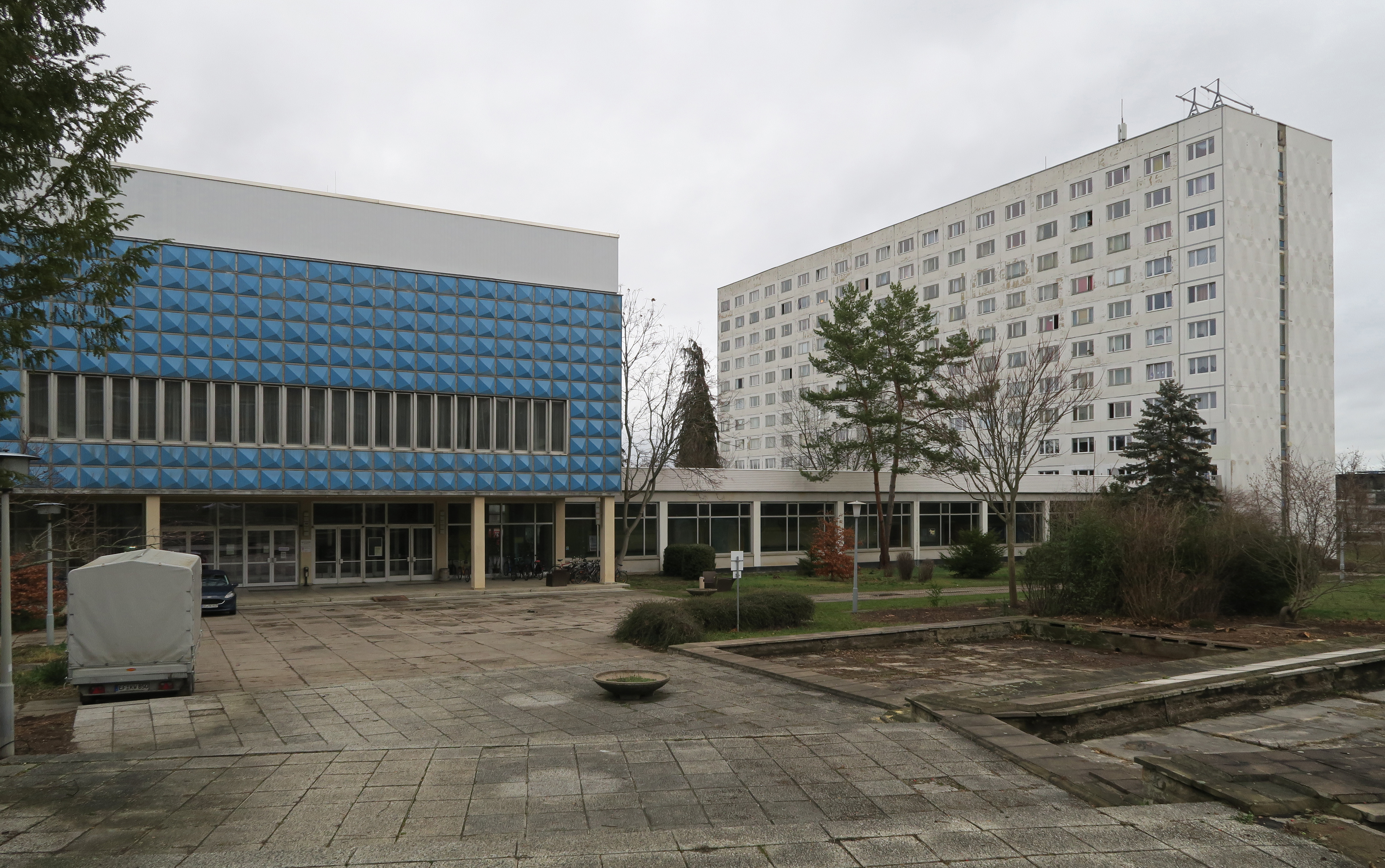
Former building of the Bezirksparteischule (BPS) "Ernst Thälmann", party school of the Bezirk Erfurt SED, in 2018

As "propaganda" in communist terminology mostly meant "elite education", the Propaganda Department (German: Abteilung Propaganda) had the aim of "cultivating a socialist consciousness" and was primarily responsible for training cadres through the SED's broad network of party schools from the "Karl Marx" Party Academy in Berlin and the 15 Bezirk party schools to 255 district and 478 workplace schools. The department additionally oversaw the Propaganda Commission and the Urania.

The Propaganda Department was originally created in 1946 as Recruitment and Training Department, from which the Party Training Department emerged in January 1947, which in October of that year was merged into the Party Training, Culture and Education Department. In 1949, the departments were separated. The Party Propaganda Department was created, which was merged with the Science and Universities Department in 1954 to form the Science and Propaganda Department. Separated again, from 1957 to 1960, it formed the Agitation and Propaganda Department together with the Agitation, Press and Radio Department.

Heads of the Propaganda Department
| Department Head | | Tenure |
|---|---|---|
| Fred Oelßner | | 1946–1947 |
| Fred Oelßner | Richard Weimann | 1947–1949 |
| Kurt Hager | | 1949–1952 |
| Kurt Schneidewind (acting) | | 1952–1954 |
merged into Science and Propaganda Department
merged into Propaganda and Agitation Department
reestablished
| Kurt Tiedke | | 1961–1979 |
| Klaus Gäbler | | 1979–1989 |

Deputy department heads include future acting department head Kurt Schneidewind (1949–1952), Richard Herber (1953), future ADN deputy general director Günter Siemund (1965–1969), Heinz Puder (at least from 1968 to 1984), and future department head Klaus Gäbler (1967–1979). Marxist historian Ernst Diehl served as deputy head of the Science and Propaganda Department from 1955 until its demerger in 1957. Otto Reinhold (1956–1961) and, briefly in 1961, Kurt Tiedke were deputy heads of the Agitation and Propaganda Department, Tiedke becoming head of the demerged Propaganda Department later that year.

=== Public Education ===
The Public Education Department (German: Abteilung Volksbildung) was responsible for the entirety of the GDR's education system, from preschool to vocational training, and the controversial Jugendwerkhof system, special reorientation camps for disorderly youth that were accused of widespread abuse.

The Public Education Department was originally created in 1946 as Culture and Education Department, but near the end of 1957, the cultural policy tasks were separated again and transferred to the Culture Department.

From the 1970s onward, the Public Education Department was unique in the sense that it was the only department where the responsible Central Committee Secretary could not issue legally binding orders to the respective Ministry as the minister Margot Honecker was the wife of General Secretary Erich Honecker. This effectively neutered the department.

Heads of the Public Education Department
| Department Head | | Tenure |
|---|---|---|
| Otto Winzer | Richard Weimann | 1946–1947 |
| Fred Oelßner | Richard Weimann | 1947–1949 |
| Stefan Heymann | | 1949 |
| Egon Rentzsch | | 1950–1953 |
| Isolde Oschmann (acting) | | 1953–1954 |
| Werner Neugebauer | | 1955–1956 |
| Hans Rießner | | 1957 |
| Werner Neugebauer | | 1958–1962 |
| Lothar Oppermann | | 1963–1989 |

Deputy department heads include Isolde Oschmann (1952–1955), Sonja Müller (from 1958 to at least 1972), Hermann Apel (c. 1973), and Rudolf Oelschlägel (c. 1983).

=== Trafficking ===
The Trafficking Department (German: Abteilung Verkehr) was a clandestine department responsible for "very secret West work", organizing courier services and secretly transferring money to the SED's West German affiliates, the German Communist Party (DKP) as well as the Socialist Unity Party of West Berlin (SEW). The SEW received about 15 million DM yearly, the DKP 70 million DM. Between the 1956 KPD ban and the 1968 DKP founding, the department set up the Deutscher Freiheitssender 904, a clandestine radio station. The department had about 256 employees in 1968, not including the roughly 36 employees of the Phönix print shop. Since autumn 1953, the department's employees were armed.

The department's relationship with the Stasi varied over time. The Stasi supported the department's work, for example providing its operatives with NVA passes to allow them to freely cross the inner-German border. However, it also exerted significant control over the department (among other things pushing through Julius Cebulla as deputy department head), to the dismay of early leading department officials in particular, who the Stasi found to be "uncooperative".

Since 1971, the department answered directly to the General Secretary of the SED.

The department was originally created in September 1948 as "Department Stahlmann" (named after its first department head Richard Stahlmann) and had a more general intelligence focus. In the mid-1960s, the department consisted of the sectors cadres, assistance, shipment, carpool, guest houses, border and the Phönix print shop. The largest change in responsibility occurred in 1966, when the department was made responsible for overseeing the SED's secret companies in West Germany. The department's documents were destroyed during the Peaceful Revolution.

In the waning days of the Central Committee in late November 1989, the Politburo decided to integrate the Trafficking Department into the International Politics and Economics Department (whose department head simultaneously took over the Trafficking Department).

Heads of the Trafficking Department
| Department Head | Tenure |
|---|---|
| Richard Stahlmann | 1948–1954 |
| Adolf Baier | 1954–1965 |
| Josef Steidl | 1965–1986 |
| Julius Cebulla | 1986–1989 |
| Gunter Rettner | 1989 |

Deputy department heads include future department head Julius Cebulla (1954–1956; 1959–1985), Wilhelm Knigge (1971–1987), Friedel Trappen (1986–1989), formerly a deputy head of the International Relations Department, and Jochen Bernhardt (1988–1989).

=== Science ===
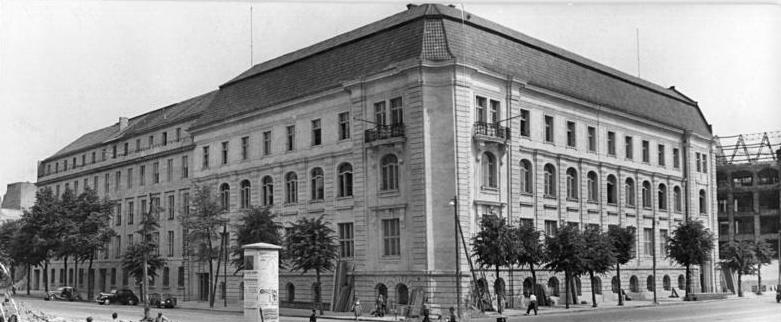
The Academy of Sciences in 1950

The Science Department (German: Abteilung Wissenschaften) formulated the SED's policy on science and higher education policy and controlled their implementation through the party organizations at universities and scientific institutions. It oversaw the Ministry for Higher and Technical Education, the Academy of Sciences of the GDR and the Academy for Social Sciences at the Central Committee of the SED. By the 1980s, it had about 27 political employees.

From 1946 to 1949, responsibility for the SED's science policy was split between the Recruitment and Training Department (which later became the Propaganda Department) and the Culture and Education Department. The latter ended up solely responsible for science policy from 1950 onward despite being renamed to Culture Department. In December 1952, the Central Committee Secretariat confirmed the structural plan for an independent Science and University Department. After being merged with the Party Propaganda Department from 1954 to 1957 as the Science and Propaganda Department, the department was reinstated, now simply named Science Department.

Heads of the Science Department
| Department Head | Tenure |
|---|---|
| Kurt Hager | 1952–1955 |
| Johannes Hörnig | 1955–1989 |

Deputy department heads include Werner Hering (1956–1959), thereafter head of the Health Policy Department, Arwed Kempke (c. 1967–1970), Siegfried Förster (c. 1970), Edwin Schwertner (1976–1986), Gregor Schirmer (1977–1989), and Kurt Rätz (at least from 1981 to 1984).

Marxist historian Ernst Diehl served as deputy head of the Science and Propaganda Department from 1955 until its demerger in 1957.

=== Security Affairs ===
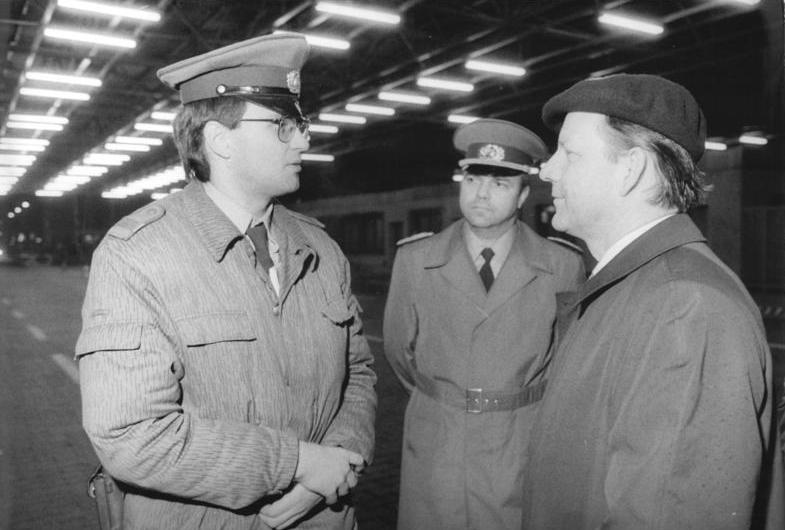
Wolfgang Herger, responsible Central Committee Secretary for and former head of the Security Affairs Department, visiting East German border guards in Berlin on 20 November 1989.

The Department for Security Affairs (German: Abteilung für Sicherheitsfragen) drafted the GDR's military doctrine, and exercised political oversight over the so-called "armed organs", the Ministry of National Defence, the Ministry of the Interior and the Ministry for State Security (Stasi) and held influence over personnel matters. In particular, the Bezirk‐level SED party organization in the National People's Army, organised as Main Political Administration in the Ministry, answered to the department in its political work. Additionally, the department oversaw the paramilitary mass organization Gesellschaft für Sport und Technik (GST). The department also edited the list of citizens who were allowed to emigrate before being given to the General Secretary for final approval. It furthermore handled the distribution of service weapons to Central Committee employees, and organized shooting exercises.

The department's control over the Ministry of National Defence and Stasi was, however, curtailed by the fact that their respective ministers were members of the Politburo. In addition, the paramilitary Combat Groups of the Working Class, while formally under the Central Committee of the SED, actually received their orders from the First Secretaries of the Bezirk party leaderships.

Nevertheless, it was one of the most powerful departments and answered directly to the General Secretary for most of its existence. For a time, the department worked under the Security Commission at the Politburo, which was replaced by the National Defence Council in March 1960, of which department heads Herbert Scheibe (1972–1985) and Wolfgang Herger (1985–1989) were members.

By December 1989, the department consisted of sectors for each of the armed organs, namely the National People's Army, the Ministry of the Interior and the Stasi, as well as a sector for "military policy mass work" (German: Wehrpolitische Massenarbeit) and a "B-work" sector, which was tasked with preparing mobilization. The editorial team of "Der Kämpfer", the Combat Groups' periodical, was also organized as a sector of the department.

The department was originally created in May 1949 as Head Office for the Protection of the National Economy at the Central Committee of the SED. An office of the same name was established within the Ministry of the Interior upon the GDR's founding in October 1949; it was spun off as the Stasi a few months later. The central committee department was later renamed to M-Department ("Military Department", presumably in reference to the KPD's clandestine intelligence agency during the Weimar Republic, the M-Apparat) and later Department 202 VW in 1950. The Security Affairs Department was then created in 1953.

Heads of the Security Affairs Department
| Department Head | Tenure | NVA officer rank | Branch |
|---|---|---|---|
| Gustav Röbelen | 1953–1956 (Note: Headed the department's predecessors since 1949.) | Generalmajor | Landstreitkräfte |
| Walter Borning (acting) | 1956–1959 | none | Landstreitkräfte |
| Bruno Wansierski (acting) | 1959–1960 | Fregattenkapitän | Volksmarine |
| Walter Borning | 1960–1972 | Generalleutnant | Landstreitkräfte |
| Herbert Scheibe | 1972–1985 | Generaloberst | Luftstreitkräfte |
| Wolfgang Herger | 1985–1989 | Civilian | N/A |
| Peter Miethe | 1989 | Konteradmiral | Volksmarine |

Deputy department heads were Walter Borning (1957–1959), who took over as acting department head in November 1956 before even being made deputy department head, Vizeadmiral Bruno Wansierski (1959–1975), who served as acting department head when Walter Borning attended the Friedrich Engels Military Academy for a one-year course from December 1959 to October 1960, Generalmajor Fritz Renckwitz (1975–1986), Siegfried Otto (at least from 1982 to 1984), and Konteradmiral Peter Miethe (1986–1989).

=== Socialist Military Education (1964–1979) ===
The Socialist Military Education Working Group (German: Arbeitsgruppe Sozialistische Wehrerziehung) was responsible for the "politico-ideological" military education in schools, which was made a compulsory subject from 1978 onward following the example of other Warsaw Pact countries, universities, businesses and through mass organizations including the FDJ, GST, FDGB as well as the Urania. Among other things, the working group worked on analyses of the athletic performance of conscripts.

The working group was established in 1964 and led by former Security Department instructor Werner Hübner. It was abolished in February 1979. Hübner returned to the Department for Security Affairs as sector head.

Heads of the Socialist Military Education Working Group
| Working Group Head | Tenure |
|---|---|
| Werner Hübner | 1964–1979 |

=== Sports ===
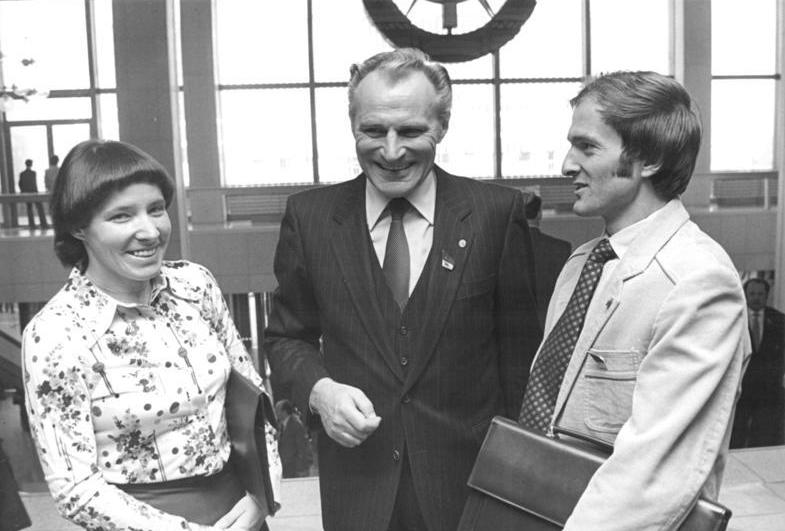
Longtime department head Rudolf Hellmann meeting with skier Veronika Hesse and marathon runner Waldemar Cierpinski ahead of the SED's X. Party Congress in April 1981.

The Sports Department (German: Abteilung Sport) was the SED's instrument for directing and controlling the areas of physical culture and sports.

It controlled the party organizations of sports associations, the Council of Ministers' State Secretariat for Physical Culture and Sport, the National Olympic Committee of the German Democratic Republic and the Deutscher Turn- und Sportbund (DTSB), the central mass organization for all sports. After the Peaceful Revolution, longtime department head Rudolf Hellmann was convicted of 137 counts of complicity to cause bodily harm for his involvement in the widespread doping of East German athletes.

Despite sport's growing importance for the GDR's international recognition, the department was fairly small compared to others, even after being elevated from a working group, with only 5 political and 2 technical employees in the 1980s. It thus had to rely more on cordial relationships with the DTSB and others to assert its positions, helped by overlapping personnel.

In 1946, a part of the Culture and Education Department was initially responsible for sport. In 1952, it was incorporated into the newly created LOPMO Department as the Sports Sector (from 1953 Youth and Sport). In August 1955, the Secretariat of the Central Committee decided to separate the sports area from this department and create a sports sector in the Security Affairs Department. An independent sports working group with six employees was created for the first time in 1961, which was given the status of a department in the mid-1960s.

Heads of the Sports Department
| Department Head | Tenure |
|---|---|
| Franz Rydz | 1953–1959 |
| Rudolf Hellmann | 1959–1989 |

Deputy department heads include Walter Gröger (c. 1967–1988) and Rudolf Kühnel (1988–1989).

=== State and Legal Affairs ===
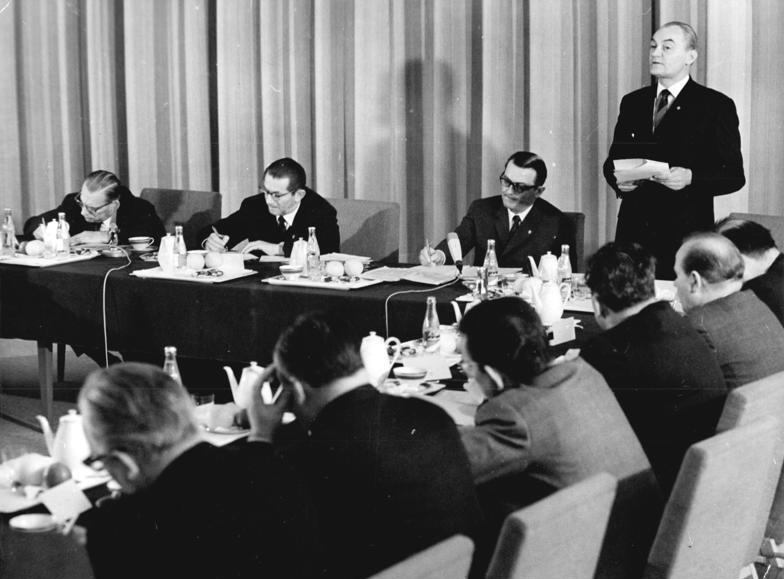
Longtime department head Klaus Sorgenicht speaking at a session of the State Council on local politics in February 1970

The State and Legal Affairs Department (German: Abteilung Staats- und Rechtsfragen) was primarily responsible for establishing, then controlling the GDR's state administration and judiciary on all levels of government, additionally overseeing the Volkskammer's legislative work, as well as the Council of Ministers' apparatus, including the administrative Office of the Council of Ministers. The training of cadres for the state apparatus and judicial system also fell under the department's purview. The department also formally nominated the heads of the Bezirk governments to the Council of Ministers for appointment, though the actual selection was done by the First Secretary of the respective Bezirk SED party organization.

Under its longtime head Klaus Sorgenicht, the department was chiefly responsible for preparing and carrying out trials against political opponents of the GDR, including show trials.

Throughout the 1950s and 1960s, Sorgenicht often proposed death penalties in his trial drafts, which became legally binding to the courts after approval by the Politburo. Among others, Sorgenicht originally proposed for dissident Gerhard Benkowitz to be executed. In December 1961, two peasants were sentenced to death on the proposal of Sorgenicht for opposing forced collectivization.

Sorgenicht was additionally complicit in preparing the electoral fraud in the 1989 local elections. He was later tried for manslaughter and deprivation of liberty, but was unable to stand trial for health reasons.

The department was originally created in June 1950 through the merger of the Municipal Politics Department, the State and Provincial Politics Department and the Judiciary Department. In the spring of 1955, the resulting State Administration Department was reorganized into the State Organs Department, which was restructured again in 1959 to form the State and Legal Affairs Department.

From January 1972, the department consisted of a state organs sector, a judiciary sector and a research assistant for political and legal sciences.

Heads of the State and Legal Affairs Department
| Department Head | Tenure |
|---|---|
| Anton Plenikowski | 1950–1954 (Note: Headed one of the department's predecessors since April 1946.) |
| Klaus Sorgenicht | 1954–1989 |
| Günter Böhme | 1989 |

Deputy department heads include Willi Barth (1950–1954), thereafter head of the spun off Church Affairs Department, Rudolf Rost (1954–1962), thereafter head of the Office of the Council of Ministers, Waldemar Pilz (1962–1969), thereafter head of the Friendly Parties Department, Günther Witteck (1969–1982), Julius Leymann (at least from 1979 to 1984), and Günter Böhme (1983–1989), and Klaus Heuer (1989).

=== Women ===
The Women Department (German: Abteilung Frauen) formulated the SED's policy on women's issues, oversaw the work of the Women's Commission at the Politburo and controlled the Democratic Women's League of Germany (DFD), the GDR's mass organization for women. The DFD received the smallest budget of all mass organizations and was largely insignificant, even compared to other mass organizations. The Women Department, women furthermore being mostly excluded from the SED's most powerful positions, was thus one of the least influential.

The Women Department was originally created in 1946 and briefly was part of the newly created LOPMO Department from 1952 to 1955. From 1956 to 1966, it only held the rank of a working group.

Heads of the Women Department
| Department Head | | Tenure |
|---|---|---|
| Elli Schmidt | Käte Kern | 1946 |
| Maria Weiterer | | 1946–1947 |
| Maria Weiterer | Marie Hartung | 1947–1949 |
| Käthe Selbmann | | 1949–1952 |
merged into LOPMO Department
reestablished
| Rosel Naumann (acting) | | 1955 |
| Edith Baumann | | 1955–1959 |
| Hilde Krasnogolowy (acting) | | 1959–1961 |
| Ingeburg Lange | | 1961–1989 |

Elli Glöckner served as deputy department head from at least 1970 to 1987, also sitting on the DFD's presidium and the Central Auditing Commission.

=== Youth ===
The Youth Department (German: Abteilung Jugend) formulated the SED's policy on youth issues (together with the Youth Commission at the Politburo) and controlled their implementation, especially working with the Free German Youth (FDJ). It was involved in the organization of the World Festival of Youth and Students in 1951 and 1973 and the all-German Deutschlandtreffen der Jugend, later the Pfingsttreffen der FDJ. By the 1980s, it had about 18 political employees.

The department was originally created in 1946, but became part of the Organization Instructor Department in November 1949. The responsibility, combined with sports as sector Youth and Sports from 1953 to 1955, became an independent working group in January 1957, getting back its department rank in January 1961.

Heads of the Youth Department
| Department Head | | Tenure |
|---|---|---|
| Paul Verner | | 1946–1947 |
| Paul Verner | Ernst Hoffmann | 1947–1948 |
| Paul Verner | | 1948–1949 |
| Erich Hönisch | | 1949–1950 |
merged into Organization Instructor Department
reestablished as sector
| Horst Schumann | | 1952–1955 |
| Horst Klemm | | 1955–1958 |
| Herbert Lautenschläger | | 1958–1959 |
| Arno Goede | | 1959–1966 |
| Gerhard Naumann (acting) | | 1966 |
| Siegfried Lorenz | | 1967–1976 |
| Wolfgang Herger | | 1976–1985 |
| Gerd Schulz | | 1985–1989 |

Deputy department heads include Gerhard Neumann (c. 1961–1974), Harry Morgenstern (c. 1974–1986), later deputy head of the International Politics and Economics Department, and Dietmar Börnert (from 1982 to at least 1985).

== Economic departments ==
Even before the forced merger of SPD and KPD, there was a Department for Economic and Cooperative Affairs, later just Economics Department, in the KPD Central Committee, which then became the Economics Department of the SED Central Committee. The department, renamed to Economic Policy Department (German: Abteilung Wirtschaftspolitik) in 1950, was responsible for establishing the German Economic Commission and the implementation of SED policies in the various economic sectors in the Soviet occupation zone and the early years of the GDR. After the founding of the GDR, it was subdivided into the areas of planning and finance, basic and heavy industry, other industrial sectors, transport and postal services, trade and supply, labor and health and cadre work.

Heads of the Economic Policy Department
| Department Head | Tenure |
|---|---|
| Bruno Leuschner | 1946–1947 |
| Willi Stoph | 1948–1950 |
| Ernst Scholz | 1950–1951 |
| Adalbert Hengst | 1951 |

On 5 November 1951, the department was abolished and its responsibilities were spun off into several new departments, namely the Planning and Finance Department, the Industry Department and the Trade and Transport Department. These departments were split again over the following years, the Industry Department was split into departments for individual sectors such as basic industries and the Trade and Transport Department was separated into a Trade, Supply and Light Industry Department and a Transport and Communications Department.

Despite the increasing number of economic departments, throughout the GDR's history, almost all of them continued to be under the auspices of a single Central Committee Secretary, Günter Mittag for all but three years from 1962 to 1989. Exceptions include the Agriculture Department and, since 1961, the Trade, Supply and Foreign Trade Department. The economic departments occupied the entire fourth floor of the Central Committee building and had a total of 270 political and 50 technical employees.

Especially during Mittag's second term in the late 1970s and the 1980s, the economic departments' authority in relation to their respective economic ministry grew greatly. Whereas previously, departments were officially only responsible for directing the party organizations in their respective fields, the department heads now acted as superiors to their ministers, directing them around, some in the same aggressive manner as Mittag.

=== Basic Industries ===
The Basic Industries Department (German: Abteilung Grundstoffindustrie) was primarily responsible for the parts of the GDR's economy that had to provide important inputs for intermediate and final production, including ore mining, raw materials, fuel and energy, additionally overseeing the core areas of the chemical industry and water management.

The department originated in the Economic Policy Department, created in 1946, where it was formally organized as heavy industry sector from November 1951 to January 1953, when it was established as an independent department. The department was initially created as Metallurgy, Mining, Chemistry and Energy Department, short "Basic Industries Department".

Heads of the Basic Industries Department
| Department Head | Tenure |
|---|---|
| Eberhard Arlt | 1951–1953 |
| Paul Kraszon | 1953–1954 |
| Hans Zimmermann (acting) | 1954–1955 |
| Berthold Handwerker | 1955–1959 |
| Günther Wyschofsky | 1959–1962 |
| Karl-Heinz Schäfer | 1962–1965 |
| Hilmar Tröger | 1965–1969 |
| Horst Wambutt | 1969–1989 |

Deputy department heads were Hans Zimmermann (from 1953) and Karl-Heinz Schäfer (until 1957), Günther Wyschofsky (1958–1959), Berthold Handwerker (1959–1960), Heinz Meyer (1960–1963), Hilmar Tröger (1963–1965), Helmut Kreher (1965–1973), Wolfgang Teichmann (1973–1975) and Manfred Mühlbach (1975–1989).

=== Comecon (1974–1985) ===
The COMECON Working Group (German: Arbeitsgruppe RGW) was responsible for the GDR's economic involvement with other states in Comecon, additionally overseeing the working group of the same name at the Office of the Council of Ministers.

The working group was originally created on 22 October 1974 from the International Economic Relations sector of the Planning and Finance Department, the sector head since December 1971, Horst Tschanter, continuing as working group head. It reverted to being a sector of the department in June 1985, now named USSR and Cooperation with Socialist Countries sector.

Heads of the COMECON Working Group
| Working Group Head | Tenure |
|---|---|
| Horst Tschanter | 1974–1985 |

Gerhard Grüner, formerly a deputy minister in the Ministry of Materials Management, served as deputy head of the working group from 13 June 1975.

=== Construction ===
The Construction Department (German: Abteilung Bauwesen) was primarily responsible for the construction and construction materials industry and supervised the Ministry for Construction (until 1958 Ministry for Reconstruction), the Construction Academy of the GDR in Berlin and the colleges of construction. The department's importance grew significantly from 1973 onward due to the massive housing programme by new SED leader Erich Honecker, aiming to eliminate the GDR's housing shortage by 1990 by building 3 million apartments. The department additionally oversaw the FDJ's "Druschba-Trasse" construction project, a section of the Soviet gas pipeline Soyuz.

The department was created in January 1953 as a spin-off of the Economic Policy Department. It was very briefly abolished to again form a "super department" for economic policy in for a few months in 1957 and 1958.

Heads of the Construction Department
| Department Head | Tenure |
|---|---|
| Ernst Scholz | 1953 |
| Alfred Schwanz | 1954–1959 |
| Gerhard Trölitzsch | 1959–1989 |

Deputy department heads include Gerhard Schütze (from 1968 to at least 1979), and Rolf Kühnert (from at least 1970 to 1989).

=== Light, Food and Bezirk-led Industry ===
The Light, Food and Bezirk-led Industry Department (German: Abteilung Leicht-, Lebensmittel- und bezirksgeleitete Industrie) was primarily responsible for the consumer goods industry as well as the parts of the GDR's economy that were managed by local authorities. The department consequently had importance for alleviating supply shortages.

The department originated in the Economic Policy Department. In November 1952, the responsibilities went into the Trade, Supply and Light Industry Department as light industry sector and food industry sector, local industry went into the Planning and Finance Department as local industry and craft sector. In March 1955, all of these responsibilities were spun off into a new Light, Food and Locally Managed Industry Department, very briefly abolished to again form a "super department" for economic policy in for a few months in 1957 and 1958 and renamed to Light, Food and Bezirk-led Industry Department in 1966.

Heads of the Light, Food and Bezirk-led Industry Department
| Department Head | Tenure |
|---|---|
| Paul Sonnenburg | 1955–1961 |
| Gerhard Briksa | 1961–1972 |
| Hans-Joachim Rüscher | 1972–1986 |
| Manfred Voigt | 1986–1989 |

Deputy department heads include future department head Hans-Joachim Rüscher (1966–1972), future Minister for Light Industry Werner Buschmann (c. 1972–1976), Herbert Hofmann (c. 1978), and Otto Bohne (c. 1984).

=== Mechanical Engineering and Metallurgy ===
The Mechanical Engineering and Metallurgy Department (German: Abteilung Maschinenbau und Metallurgie) was responsible for the areas of mechanical engineering (general and heavy engineering, mechanical and plant engineering, tool, agricultural machinery, vehicle and aircraft construction as well as processing machinery construction), metallurgy and electrical engineering, covering the responsibilities of five industrial ministries. It had more than thirty employees.

The department was one of the most important owing to the importance of vehicle construction and particularly mechanical engineering to the GDR's economy. The department's importance only grew in the second half of the 1980s due to the massive investments aimed at establishing a semiconductor industry.

The department was established in January 1953 as Mechanical Engineering and Metallurgy, Mining, Chemistry and Energy Department and for a few year was a sector of the Industry Department. In May 1958, the department was reestablished as Mechanical Engineering and Metallurgy Department, the sectors of mining, chemical and energy forming a recreated, smaller Basic Industries Department.

Heads of the Mechanical Engineering and Metallurgy Department
| Department Head | Tenure |
|---|---|
| Heinz Thiele | 1953 |
| Friedrich Zeiler | 1953–1955 |
| Heinrich Müller | 1955–1957 |
merged into Industry Department
reestablished
| Friedrich Zeiler | 1958–1961 |
| Werner Weiß | 1961–1962 |
| Fritz Brock (acting) | 1962–1963 |
| Gerhard Tautenhahn | 1964–1986 |
| Klaus Blessing | 1986–1989 |

Deputy department heads include Hermann Pöschel (1956–1958), thereafter head of the Research, Technical Development and Investment Policy Working Group, Fritz Brock (1958–1964), Werner Liebig (c. 1970), and Siegfried Leiterer (1968–1988).

=== Planning and Finance ===
The Planning and Finance Department (German: Abteilung Planung und Finanzen) managed national economic planning, including five-year plans, state budgets, financial policies, and economic analyses.

It had broad responsibilities covering all sectors of the East German economy, making it by far the most important and powerful economic department. It increasingly acted as "general staff" for Central Committee Secretary for economics Günter Mittag, preparing all important economic decisions. With 35 employees, it was also the largest economic department and its employees held privileged access to economic data. In relation to other departments, it effectively acted as a "main department", other department heads having to get approval for their policy drafts from the Planning and Finance Department.

The department was created in 1951 as a spin-off of the Economic Policy Department and existed continuously since then with minor changes to its structure. The sector for research and technology was spun off into a new Research, Technical Development and Investment Policy Working Group in 1958 and the sector responsible for Comecon became an independent working group in 1974.

By 1989, it consisted of sectors for Labor Economics, Finance and Prices, Fixed Assets and Materials Economics, Planning, National Economic Analysis and Statistics, Military Economics, and the USSR and Cooperation with Socialist Countries.

Heads of the Planning and Finance Department
| Department Head | Tenure |
|---|---|
| Wolfgang Berger | 1951–1953 |
| Helmut Sandig | 1954–1955 |
| Fritz Müller | 1955–1960 |
| Gerhard Schürer | 1960–1962 |
| Siegfried Böhm | 1963–1966 |
| Karl Hengst | 1966–1969 |
| Erich Wappler | 1969–1974 |
| Günter Ehrensperger | 1974–1989 |

Deputy department heads include Walter Halbritter (1960–1961), future department heads Gerhard Schürer (1958–1960), Siegfried Böhm (1961–1963), Karl Hengst (1963–1966), Erich Wappler (1967–1969), and Günter Ehrensperger (c. 1967–1974), as well as Harry Brettschneider (1970s), and Heinz Wildenhain (1969–1982), future head of the Financial Management and Party Businesses Department. Other important party officials such as Günther Jahn and Carl-Heinz Janson also served as employees of the department early on in their careers.

=== Research and Technical Development ===
The Research and Technical Development Department (German: Abteilung Forschung und technische Entwicklung) oversaw basic industrial research, invention, patenting, standardization, technical monitoring, information, documentation, and guided subordinate party bodies in scientific and technical institutions, covering all technical offices and institutions in East Germany. It had about twenty employees.

The department was originally created in 1958 as Research, Technical Development and Investment Policy Working Group as a spin-off of the Planning and Finance Department. The working group got full department rank in 1967.

Heads of the Research and Technical Development Department
| Department Head | Tenure |
|---|---|
| Hermann Pöschel | 1958–1989 |

Deputy department heads include Karl-Heinz Kuntsche (at least from 1967 to 1984).

=== Socialist Economic Management ===
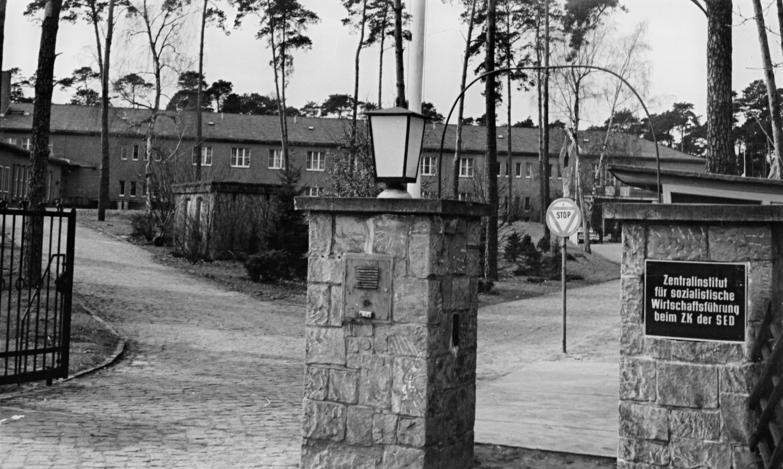
The Central Institute for Socialist Economic Management in Berlin-Rahnsdorf in 1966

The Socialist Economic Management Department (German: Abteilung Sozialistische Wirtschaftsführung) was responsible for the training future economic cadres, especially VEB and combine directors.

The department closely worked with the Central Institute for Socialist Economic Management at the Central Committee of the SED, founded in November 1965 and given promotion rights shortly afterward, for this purpose. Longtime Central Committee Secretary for economics Günter Mittag also came to delegate various other miscellaneous tasks to the department. Throughout its existence, the department had eight political and two technical employees.

The department was originally created in 1965 as a working group, receiving full department rank in 1967.

Heads of the Socialist Economic Management Department
| Department Head | Tenure |
|---|---|
| Günther Jahn | 1965–1966 |
| Carl-Heinz Janson | 1966–1989 |

Heinz Klempke, simultaneously a deputy head of the Transport and Communications Department, served as deputy department head for most of the department's history, from at least March 1970 to 1989.

=== Trade, Supply and Foreign Trade ===
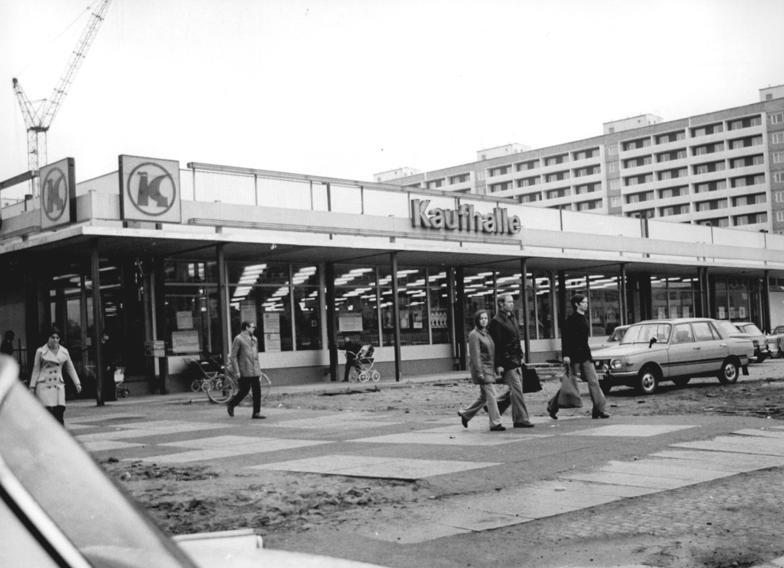
A Konsum store in Dresden in April 1974. The department oversaw Konsum's parent, the Association of German Consumer Cooperatives.

The Trade, Supply and Foreign Trade Department (German: Abteilung Handel, Versorgung und Außenhandel) oversaw and set prices for domestic trade in consumer goods and services as well as foreign trade, closely working with the State Planning Commission.

The department was unique in that, since November 1961, it was the only economic department not overseen by the Central Committee Secretary for economics (Günter Mittag for all but three years from 1962 to 1989), though he still held a great deal of influence over its work. The exception were questions about basic services, tariffs, rents and consumer prices.

The department was created on 5 November 1951 as Trade and Transport Department as a spin-off of the Economic Policy Department. In November 1952, it was reorganized as Trade, Supply and Light Industry Department, before the responsibility for light industry went to the Light, Food and Local Industry Department in March 1955.

Heads of the Trade, Supply and Foreign Trade Department
| Department Head | Tenure |
|---|---|
| Karl Gaile | 1951–1953 |
| Ernst Lange | 1953–1966 |
| Hilmar Weiß | 1967–1989 |

Deputy department heads include Karl Gaile (1951–1953), Herbert Bäger (1953–1954), Harry Schindler (1954–1958), future Minister for Foreign Trade Horst Sölle (1958–1962), Rudolf Murgott (1964–1968), Degenhard Albrecht (1970–1979), Robert Habermann (at least from 1980 to 1984), and Günter Ballauf.

=== Trade Unions and Social Policy ===
The Trade Unions and Social Policy Department (German: Abteilung Gewerkschaften und Sozialpolitik) was responsible for controlling the work and staffing of the mass organization Free German Trade Union Federation (FDGB) and its constituent trade unions, labor law and occupational safety, the social security system and for formulating the SED's social policy, in particular regarding wages and pensions. The department did not, however, have control over the FDGB's day-to-day operations as both chairmen Herbert Warnke and Harry Tisch were members of the Politburo.

The department was already set up in June 1945 in the Central Committee of the KPD as Labor and Social Welfare Department. It was abolished in June 1950 and integrated into the Economic Policy Department as labor and trade union sector, which was later transferred to the newly created LOPMO Department. In November 1952, the Politburo created a Labor, Social and Health Services Department, which absorbed the labor and trade union sector in January 1957, creating the Trade Unions, Social and Health Services Department. In 1959, this department was split into the Health Policy Department and the Trade Unions and Social Policy Department.

Heads of the Trade Unions and Social Policy Department
| Department Head | Tenure |
|---|---|
| Rudolf Weck | 1946–1949 |
| Emil Paffrath | 1949–1950 |
integrated into Economic Policy Department
transferred into LOPMO Department
reestablished as sector
| Fritz Schellhorn | 1953–1956 |
| Fritz Rettmann | 1957–1962 |
| Josef Steidl | 1962–1965 |
| Fritz Brock | 1965–1989 |

Deputy department heads include future department head Fritz Schellhorn (1953), and Erhard Schulze (from 1961 to at least 1980).

=== Transport and Communications ===
The Transport and Communications Department (German: Abteilung Transport und Nachrichtenwesen) was responsible for areas of transport (Deutsche Reichsbahn, motor transport, shipping), traffic, postal services (Deutsche Post of the GDR) and telecommunications and was responsible for their implementation together with the central state institutions. It had a tangential role in press censorship in East Germany through its oversight over the Ministry of Post and Telecommunications; foreign publications in particular could effectively be banned by striking them of the Deutsche Post's newspaper roster, as for example happened with the Życie Warszawy in September 1980.

The department originated in the Economic Policy Department. In November 1952, the Transport and Communications Department was created from the former Transport Sector in the Trade and Transport Department. It was renamed to Railway, Transport and Communications Department. It was very briefly abolished to again form a "super department" for economic policy in for a few months in 1957 and 1958. After further renaming, the department was again called Transport and Communications Department since 1972.

Heads of the Transport and Communications Department
| Department Head | Tenure |
|---|---|
| Günter Mittag | 1953–1958 |
| Volkmar Winkler | 1958–1962 |
| Hubert Egemann | 1962–1987 |
| Dieter Wösterfeld | 1987–1989 |

Deputy department heads include Heinz Klempke, future department heads Volkmar Winkler (1956–1958), and Hubert Egemann (1960–1962), as well as Manfred Calov (1962–1972), Dieter Zobel (c. 1970), and Heinz Aull (1971–1981).

== Internal departments ==
In addition to the numerous departments working on policy issues of East Germany, there were several departments responsible for internal administrative tasks of the party. These departments were usually not assigned to a Central Committee Secretary, instead answering to the department-level Office of the Politburo.

=== Management of Party Enterprises ===
The Management of Party Enterprises Department (German: Abteilung Verwaltung der Wirtschaftsbetriebe) mainly provided services for the Central Committee such as property management, catering, guest houses, the polyclinic, the childcare facilities and the transport service. The department was also responsible for the procurement of office materials and the provisioning of office spaces.

The department answered to the head of the Politburo's Office.

Heads of the Management of Party Enterprises Department
| Department Head | Tenure |
|---|---|
| Eleonore Pieck | 1946–1949 |
| Emil Scheweleit | 1950–1958 |
| Walter Heibich | 1958–1963 |
| Günter Glende | 1964–1989 |

Deputy department heads include future department heads Walter Heibich (1952–1958), and Günter Glende (1961–1964), as well as Heinz Simon (appointed 1976).

=== Financial Management and Party Businesses ===
The Financial Management and Party Businesses Department (German: Abteilung Finanzverwaltung und Parteibetriebe) oversaw the party's finances and, together with the KoKo, controlled the vast amount of commercial venues of the SED.

The SED was one of the richest party in Europe at the time, operating the printing house VOB Zentrag, which had a near-monopoly on printing, the film studio DEFA, the small exports company Genex, the real estate company OEB Fundament and many others, employing 40.000 in 1989. The department answered to the head of the Politburo's Office (from 1953 to June 1971 and since 1984) and it was additionally controlled by the Central Auditing Commission.

In 1989, the department consisted of the sectors financial planning and accounting, management and facilities, material planning and accounting, party operations and Fundament.

Heads of the Financial Management and Party Businesses Department
| Department Head | Tenure |
|---|---|
| Rudolf Appelt | 1946–1947 |
| Walter Beling | 1947–1950 |
| Karl Raab | 1950–1981 |
| Heinz Wildenhain | 1981–1989 |
| Wolfgang Langnitschke | 1989 |

Deputy department heads include Paul Hockarth (1950–1967; concurrently General Director of Zentrag from 1963 to 1967), Karl Brauer (1950–1979), Walter Heibich (1964–1969), Werner Würzberger (1964–1983), and Wolfgang Langnitschke (1987–1989).

=== Office of the Politburo ===
The Office of the Politburo (German: Büro des Politbüros) supported the Politburo's work by preparing and keeping minutes of its meetings. The Office additionally prepared party conferences, meetings of the Central Committee and foreign trips of the General Secretary of the SED and held control over access to foreign literature, travel, classified documents, the Central Committee building and services associated with the Central Committee such as the government hospital in Berlin-Buch and the government's Transport Aviation Squadron 44.

All of these organizational tasks, in particular its control over the Politburo's agenda and information flow, made it one of the most powerful Central Committee offices, further supported by the fact that longtime head Gisela Glende was married to Günter Glende, longtime head of the Management of Party Enterprises Department, another powerful internal department.

The Office of the Politburo was originally created in September 1953, when the Office of the Secretariat, previously the Office of the Central Secretariat (1946–1949) and the Office of the Small Secretariat (1949), was restructured. The General Department at the Party Executive of the SED-PDS existed briefly in December 1989 to dissolve the Office of the Politburo.

Heads of the Office of the Politburo
| Office Head | | Tenure |
|---|---|---|
| Richard Gyptner | Fritz Schreiber | 1946–1948 |
| Richard Gyptner | Alexander Lösche | 1948–1949 |
| Rudolf Thunig | | 1949 |
| Otto Schön | | 1950–1968 |
| Gisela Glende | | 1968–1986 |
| Edwin Schwertner | | 1986–1989 |

Deputy heads include future head Gisela Glende (1951–1968), and Tilo Fischer (at least from 1979 to 1981).

=== Protocol ===
The Protocol Department (German: Protokollabteilung) was responsible for receiving foreign visitors, which in the SED's conception included West German politicians. It had a dedicated room with presents in the Central Committee building's basement for this purpose.

The Protocol Department was created in September 1959, initially as part of the Office of the Politburo and with four employees, including a head and a secretary. Care was taken to have staff fluent in English, French and Russian.

It's only known heads were Kurt Streich, who served from at least 1966 to his death in June 1971, and his successor Jost Becher.

Heads of the Protocol Department
| Department Head | Tenure |
|---|---|
| Kurt Streich | c. 1960s–1971† |
| Jost Becher | 1971–? |

=== Telecommunications (1957–1986) ===
The Telecommunications Department (German: Abteilung Fernmeldewesen) was responsible for the Central Committee's telecommunications and telex centers as well as encryption and news operations service. The department answered to the head of the Politburo's Office. Longtime department head Heinz Lübbe was a Major in the Stasi.

The department originated in the May 1949 merger of the Telex station in the Office of the Small Secretariat (predecessor of the Office of the Politburo) and the Telephone switchboard in the Enterprise Department. In September 1957, the resulting Telecommunications control center became its own department, reverting back to a sector of the Office of the Politburo in 1986.

Heads of the Telecommunications Department
| Department Head | Tenure |
|---|---|
| Heinz Zumpe | 1967–1975 |
| Heinz Lübbe | 1975–1986 |

== Department-level institutions ==
=== Dietz ===
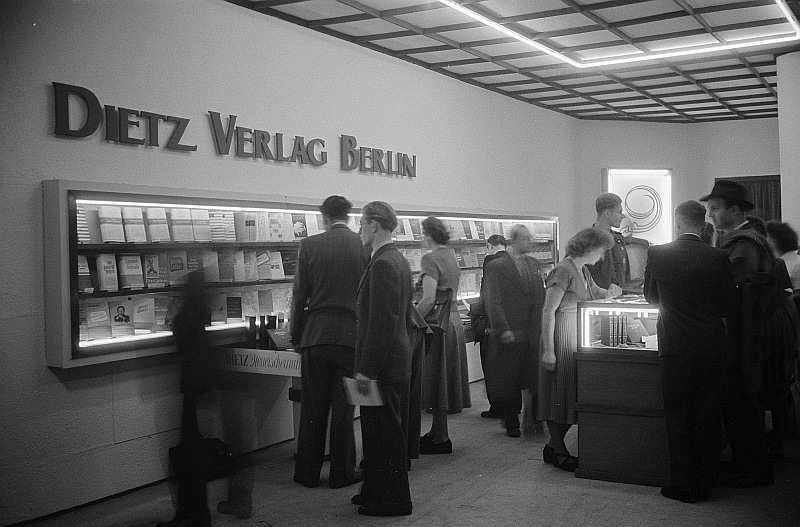
The Dietz-Verlag exhibition stand at the 1951 Leipzig Book Fair

The Dietz Publishing House (German: Dietz Verlag) was the central party publishing house of the SED. The publications primarily included works by the classics of Marxism–Leninism (especially the Marx-Engels-Gesamtausgabe), as well as speeches and essays by leading SED officials, publications on philosophical, economic and party history topics and propaganda pamphlets. Fiction was also published. It had around 200 employees before the Peaceful Revolution.

The Dietz Publishing House was founded on 18 June 1946 through the merger of the KPD publishing house "Neuer Weg" and SPD publishing house "Vorwärts". It was named after Karl Dietz, head of a small publishing house in Rudolstadt, the name deliberately being similar to the otherwise unrelated J.H.W. Dietz Publishing House, the SPD's publishing house with a tradition dating back to the 19th century.

The publishing house, which since 1965 was legally incorporated as an organization-owned business (German: Organisationseigener Betrieb) (OEB) of the SED, had department rank for most of its existence, but was controlled to a significant degree by other departments: The Propaganda Department exercised ideological control and the Financial Management and Party Businesses Department handled Dietz's economic affairs. From 1957 to 1960, it was organized as a sector of the Agitation and Propaganda Department.

After the Peaceful Revolution, the publishing house was converted to the "Dietz-Verlag Berlin GmbH", which was taken over by the Treuhandanstalt, who wanted to liquidate it, on 24 July 1991. It was given back to the SED's successor, the Party of Democratic Socialism (PDS), in January 1994 as part of its settlement with the Treuhandanstalt's successor in regards to the former SED's assets. It continues to exist to this day, now controlled by The Left's Rosa Luxemburg Foundation, named Karl Dietz Verlag Berlin since 1999 as part of a settlement with the J.H.W. Dietz Publishing House.

Directors of the Dietz Publishing House
| Director | | Tenure |
|---|---|---|
| Fritz Schälike | Kurt Schöpflin | 1946–1948 |
| Fritz Schälicke | | 1948–1962 |
| Günter Hennig | | 1962–1989 |

=== Einheit ===
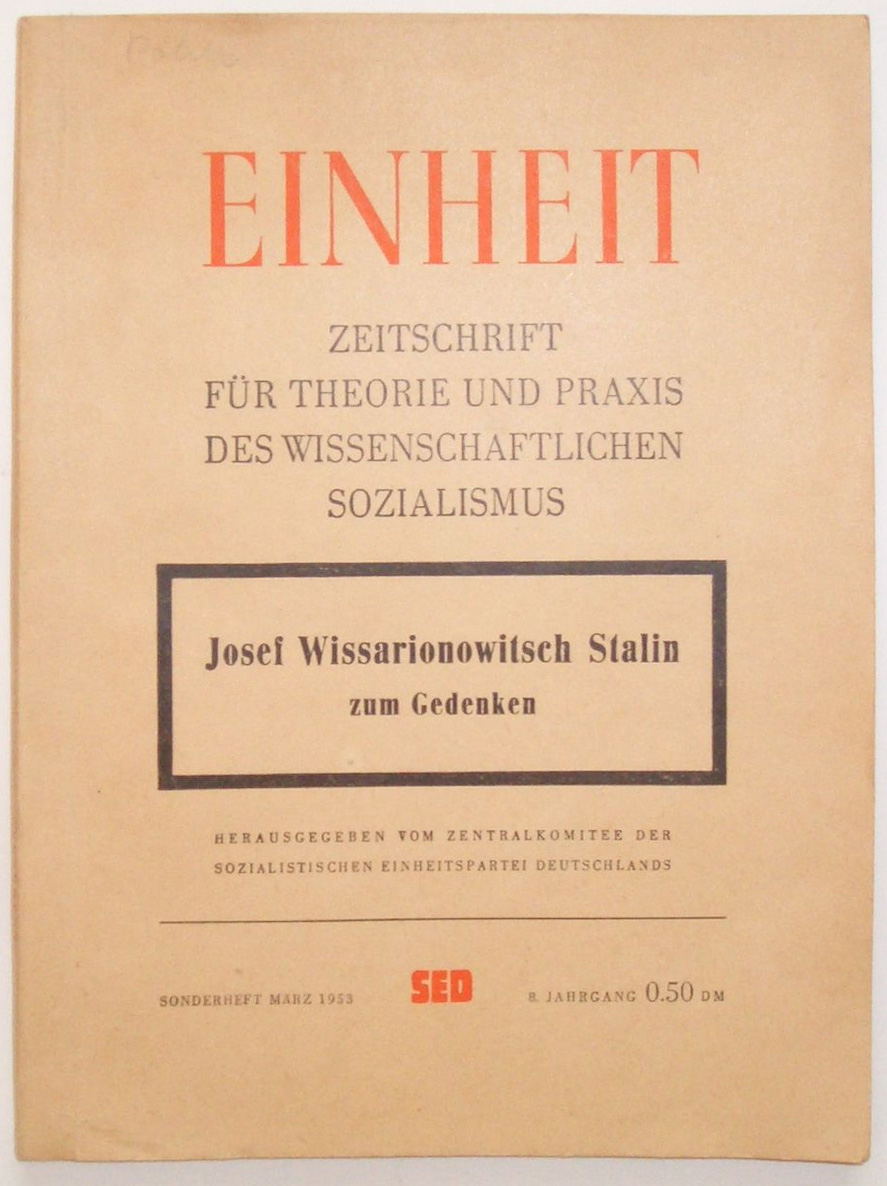
An early issue of Einheit

The Einheit editorial team (German: Redaktion "Einheit") published Einheit, the theoretical journal of the SED, its topics ranging from the history of the German and international workers' movement to philosophical and economic problems. It was largely written by leading SED officials and senior staff members of central party institutes.

Einheit was generally published monthly (in 1951, occasionally fortnightly) and at special social events. Its circulation fluctuated between 96,000 and 250,000 copies over the years. It ceased publication at the end of 1989.

Einheit was first published in February 1946, as a joint publication of the KPD and SPD, the journal's subheading at the time being "Monthly magazine for the preparation of the Socialist Unity Party".

Editors-in-chief of Einheit
| Editor-in-chief | | Tenure |
|---|---|---|
| Emmi Dölling | Max Seydewitz | 1946 |
| Klaus Zwilling | | 1946–1950 |
| Gertrud Keller | | 1950–1951 |
| Hans Schaul | | 1956–1972 |
| Manfred Banaschak | | 1972–1989 |

=== Neuer Weg ===
The Neuer Weg editorial team (German: Redaktion "Neuer Weg") published Neuer Weg, a biweekly journal for party functionaries of the SED, covering "party life". It provided functionaries with suggestions, arguments and support for their party work. Additionally, it published articles on the work of various party organizations as well as policy materials, such as selected documents from meetings of the Central Committee and resolutions of the Politburo and Secretariat. Its circulation fluctuated between 100,000 and 360,000 copies over the years. It ceased publication at the end of 1989.

Neuer Weg was first published in January 1946 with the subheading "Monthly magazine for current issues of the labor movement" by the Central Committee of the KPD.

Throughout its existence, the editorial office largely had the status of a department of the Central Committee, but was always closely linked to the Party Organs Department, the editorial office generally receiving information on party life from the department's Party Information Sector. For a time in the 1960s, it was even organizationally subordinate to this department.

Editors-in-chief of Neuer Weg
| Editor-in-chief | Tenure |
|---|---|
| Emmi Dölling | 1946–1949 (Note: Dölling was gravely ill of tuberculosis from 1947 to 1949, spending 1948 and 1949 in a sanatorium in Sülzhayn.) |
| Rudolf Mießner | 1949–1956 |
| Fritz Geißler | 1956–1960 |
| Rudolf Wettengel | 1960–1973 |
| Werner Scholz | 1973–1989 |

== As ranks ==
"Department Head of the Central Committee" and "Deputy Department Head of the Central Committee" were also used as ranks for political employees in the Central Committee apparatus outside of departments and department-level institutions. For example, KoKo head Alexander Schalck-Golodkowski held the rank of a Central Committee department head in addition to his – inferior – ministerial rank of state secretary. Joachim Herrmann held the rank of a deputy department head during his brief tenure as full-time political employee of the Politburo West Commission, as did full-time employees of other Politburo commissions, as well as the personal assistants to the Politburo members.

Owing to the strict hierarchy within the Central Committee apparatus, being a department head or deputy department head came with a number of privileges. Compared to basic political employees and sector heads, department heads and deputy department heads for example had access to an à la carte restaurant as opposed to the canteen. A deputy department head had a salary of 2,500 East German mark, around double that of an average East German worker, and access to a company car, as well as the GDR's elite government hospitals.

== See also ==
- List of members of the Secretariat of the Central Committee of the SED
- List of members of the Politburo of the Central Committee of the SED
- List of candidates for the Politburo of the Central Committee of the SED
