= Julius Cebulla =

German politician (1917–1999)

Head of the Trafficking Department of the Central Committee
- In office 1 October 1986 – 1 December 1989
- Secretary: Erich Honecker; Egon Krenz
- Deputy: Wilhelm Knigge; Friedel Trappen; Jochen Bernhardt
- Preceded by: Josef Steidl
- Succeeded by: Gunter Rettner

Personal details
- Born: Julius Johannes Cebulla; 30 June 1917 Brinnitz, Province of Silesia, Kingdom of Prussia, German Empire (now Brynica, Poland)
- Died: 24 March 1999 (aged 81)
- Party: Socialist Unity Party (1951–1989)
- Education: Humboldt University of Berlin (Dr. rer. pol.); "Karl Marx" Party Academy (Dipl.-Ges.-Wiss.)
- Occupation: Party Functionary; Policeman; Carpenter
- Awards: Patriotic Order of Merit, 1st class

Julius Johannes "Jonny" Cebulla (30 June 1917 – 24 March 1999) was an East German policeman and party functionary of the Socialist Unity Party (SED).

Cebulla spent over thirty years, including three as department head, as an employee of the Trafficking Department of the Central Committee, a clandestine department mainly responsible for secret courier services and money transfers to the SED's West German affiliates. His career was aided by his good relationship with the Stasi, the intelligence service and secret police.

Cebulla resigned during the Peaceful Revolution in 1989, only a few days ahead of the Central Committee's collective resignation.

== Life and career ==
=== Early career ===
Cebulla was born in 1917 in the Upper Silesian village of Brinnitz to a working-class family. After attending primary school, he completed an apprenticeship as a carpenter.

After being drafted into compulsory labor service the in Reich Labor Service in 1937, Cebulla was conscripted into the Wehrmacht in 1938, where he served as a soldier throughout World War II. He then spent time as a prisoner of war in the Soviet Union until 1949, during which he attended an anti-fascist school.

Cebulla returned to East Germany, where he joined the Volkspolizei, East Germany's national police force, as a guard and was soon promoted to command leader and later to house commander. That same year, he completed a one-year course at the Higher Police School in Dessau-Kochstedt. Between 1950 and 1953, he served as a department head and instructor in the Volkspolizei main administration. He was promoted to captain in 1951 after joining the ruling Socialist Unity Party.

=== Trafficking Department ===
In early 1953, he joined the apparatus of the Central Committee of the SED as instructor in the Trafficking Department. The Trafficking Department was a clandestine department, responsible for secret courier services and money transfers to communist and socialist parties in capitalist countries, especially the SED's West German affiliates, the German Communist Party and the Socialist Unity Party of West Berlin, which received 70 and 15 million DM per year respectively. The department additionally financed the Deutscher Freiheitssender 904, a clandestine radio station of the banned Communist Party of Germany (KPD). Cebulla was initially appointed as one of five instructors responsible for "border work", coordinating secret transfers of material and people across the inner-German border to the KPD.

Unlike most other high-ranking department cadres, Cebulla had good relations with the Stasi. Against the wishes of department head Adolf Baier, but with support from the Stasi, Cebulla was promoted to deputy department head on 15 July 1954, a position he would hold for the next 32 years, with a brief interruption from 1956 to 1959 to attend a three-year course at the "Karl Marx" Party Academy, where he graduated with a diploma in social sciences (Dipl.-Ges.-Wiss.).

While serving as deputy department head, he earned a doctorate in political sciences (Dr. rer. pol.) from the Humboldt University of Berlin in 1971. Other department cadres, many disliking Cebulla for his closeness with the Stasi, alleged that his doctoral thesis was not written by him.

In October 1986, Cebulla succeeded the retiring Josef Steidl as department head. Cebulla had had a tense relationship with Steidl, as he had had with Baier. In this role, he worked closely with the secret foreign currencies procurement office "KoKo" under Alexander Schalck-Golodkowski. Cebulla was responsible for personnel matters, while Schalck-Golodkowski handled economic affairs of the SED's secret companies in West Germany. In this arrangement, Cebulla was known by the handle "Szigulla".

In the midst of the Peaceful Revolution, Cebulla requested his retirement as department head "for age reasons" on 28 November 1989, only a few days ahead of the Central Committee's collective resignation. He formally left office on 1 December 1989, Gunter Rettner, simultaneously head of the International Politics and Economics Department having already succeeded him two days earlier.

Cebulla went into retirement and died on 24 March 1999.
