= Johannes Hörnig =

East German politician (1921–2001)

Head of the Science Department of the Central Committee
- In office 15 April 1955 – 16 November 1989
- Secretary: Kurt Hager; Gregor Schirmer
- Deputy: Werner Hering; Arwed Kempke; Siegfried Förster; Edwin Schwertner; Gregor Schirmer; Kurt Rätz
- Preceded by: Kurt Hager
- Succeeded by: Position abolished

Personal details
- Born: 1 April 1921 Leppersdorf (Wachau), Free State of Saxony, Weimar Republic (now Germany)
- Died: 24 January 2001 (aged 79) Berlin, Germany
- Party: Socialist Unity Party (1946–1989)
- Other political affiliations: Social Democratic Party (1945–1946)
- Education: "Karl Marx" Party Academy (Dipl.-Ges.-Wiss.)
- Occupation: Politician; Party Functionary
- Awards: Patriotic Order of Merit, 1st class; Hero of Labour
- Central institution membership: 1967–1989: Full member, Central Committee; 1963–1967: Candidate member, Central Committee; Other offices held: 1953–1954: Deputy Head, Science Department of the Central Committee

Johannes "Hannes" Hörnig (1 April 1921 – 24 January 2001) was an East German politician.

From 1955 till 1989 he headed the Science Department of the ruling party Central Committee, and for more than twenty years, from 1967 till 1989, he was himself a member of the powerful Party Central Committee.

== Life ==
Johannes Hörnig was born into a working-class family in Leppersdorf a small village between Dresden and Bautzen. The population of the village had declined significantly in recent decades thanks to the lure of higher wages in the industrialising towns and cities of eastern Saxony. His father was a factory worker. In 1935 the younger Hörnig undertook an apprenticeship with Gläser-Karosserie, a bespoke coachbuilder (car-body manufacturer), in nearby Radeberg. He stayed with the firm till 1940, which is when he reached the age of 19 and joined the army, rising to the rank of junior officer in the armory division by 1945.

War, which had broken out in 1939, ended in defeat for Germany in May 1945. Saxony now found itself administered as part of the Soviet occupation zone in what remained of Germany. Hörnig joined the Social Democratic Party and, following the contentious party merger involving the Communists, signed his party membership across to the newly formed Socialist Unity Party (SED / Sozialistische Einheitspartei Deutschlands) in 1946. On the professional front, he enrolled for the fast-track on-the-job teacher training scheme that had been introduced to address the acute labour shortage affecting the schools sector. After this he worked as a primary school teacher in the village of Obersteina. In May 1949 he also became secretary to the district leadership for the Trade Union Federation (FDGB), which under the control structure emerging in the occupation zone was closely integrated into the overall administrative structure. By 1950 he had been promoted to the regional schools council. Meanwhile, formally in October 1949, the Soviet occupation zone was re-founded as the German Democratic Republic, a Soviet sponsored stand-alone German state governed, again, as a one-party dictatorship, but this time with a constitutional arrangements modeled on the Soviet Union itself. The ruling party was the SED: opposition parties were not banned, but instead tightly controlled by the ruling party. Between 1950 and 1952 Johannes Hörnig underwent a period of study at the Party Academy, emerging with a degree in Social Sciences.

His degree from the Party Academy marked a change in career direction: in 1953 Hörnig took a job working for the Central Committee of the ruling SED (party) as a section leader. In 1955 he was promoted to the position of Department head for the Central Committee's Science Department, in succession to Kurt Hager who had also been promoted. Johannes Hörnig retained his position in charge of the Central Committee's Science Department till 1989. Under a constitutional structure that insisted on the leading role of The Party, ultimate political power lay neither with the national legislature (Volkskammer) nor with government ministers, but with the ruling party. Hörnig's work for the party central committee therefore placed him at the heart of the nation's power structure. In 1963 his own name appeared on the list of candidates for Central Committee membership, and in 1967 he became one of the (by this stage) 131 Central Committee members. He continued to serve as a Central Committee member till 1989.

The breach of the Berlin Wall in November 1989, together with the realisation that Soviet troops in East Germany had no instructions violently to suppress the rising tide of popular protests against the regime, opened the way for a series of events that would lead to the demise, as a standalone one-party state, of the German Democratic Republic and, in October 1990, to German reunification. In the meantime, during November and December 1989 there were numerous resignations from positions of political power: this included the resignation of the Party Central Committee. During these final months of 1989 Johannes Hörnig's political career also ended.

== Awards and honours ==
- 1959 Patriotic Order of Merit in Bronze
- 1971 Patriotic Order of Merit in Silver
- 1972 Distinguished Service Medal of the National People's Army
- 1975 Battle order "for Services to The People and The Fatherland"
- 1976 Distinguished Service Medal of the National People's Army
- 1980 Patriotic Order of Merit in Gold
- 1981 Patriotic Order of Merit Gold Clasp
- 1984 Hero of Labour (GDR)
- Honorary doctorate and professorship "Karl Marx University", Leipzig
