= Carl-Heinz Janson =

East German party functionary (1931–2015)

Head of the Socialist Economic Management Department of the Central Committee (Note: Socialist Economic Management Working Group until 1967)
- In office 11 May 1966 – December 1989
- Secretary: Günter Mittag; Werner Krolikowski; Günter Mittag; Wolfgang Rauchfuß
- Deputy: Heinz Klempke
- Preceded by: Günther Jahn
- Succeeded by: Position abolished

Personal details
- Born: 13 December 1931 Waltershausen, State of Thuringia, Weimar Republic (now Germany)
- Died: 23 September 2015 (aged 83) Berlin, Germany
- Party: Socialist Unity Party (1949–1989)
- Education: "Karl Marx" Party Academy; Hochschule für Ökonomie Berlin (Dipl.-Wirtsch.)
- Occupation: Party Functionary; Economist
- Awards: Banner of Labor; Patriotic Order of Merit, 2nd class

Carl-Heinz Janson (13 December 1931 – 23 September 2015) was an East German economist and party functionary of the Socialist Unity Party (SED).

Janson served as an employee in the apparatus of the Central Committee of the SED for over twenty-eight years, including twenty-three years as head of the Socialist Economic Management Department, also serving on the Politburo Economic Commission. He was forced into retirement during the Peaceful Revolution and became a vocal critic of the East German command economy, putting particular blame for its failure on longtime Central Committee Secretary for economics Günter Mittag.

== Life and career in East Germany ==
=== Early life and career ===
Carl-Heinz Janson was born on 13 December 1931 in Waltershausen to a working-class family. After the war, he joined the Free German Youth (FDJ), the only legal youth movement in East Germany, in 1948 and the ruling Socialist Unity Party (SED) on his eighteenth birthday in 1949. He completed his Abitur in 1950 and thereafter attended the SED's "Karl Marx" Party Academy. From 1952 to 1958, he attended the Hochschule für Ökonomie Berlin, a university set up by the SED to train future economic functionaries, concurrently serving as a party secretary for the SED party organization at the university.

After graduating with a diploma in economics (Dipl.-Wirtsch.), Janson was initially employed as an economist in a non-ferrous metallurgy company in Aue.

=== SED Central Committee ===
In February 1961, Janson joined the apparatus of the Central Committee of the SED, initially as an employee of the Politburo Economic Commission. When it was abolished a few months later, he was moved to the powerful Planning and Finance Department, tasked with establishing a sector to coordinate with the Volkswirtschaftsrat. The following year, he was made head of the planning sector.

On 11 May 1966, Janson was promoted to become the head of the recently established Socialist Economic Management Working Group, succeeding Günther Jahn, who was moved to the Central Council of the FDJ.

The working group, which was elevated to a department in 1967, was responsible for the training of economic functionaries, especially directors of VEBs and combines, but also vocational education, closely working with the similarly named Central Institute for Socialist Economic Management as a partner. Longtime Central Committee Secretary for economics Günter Mittag also came to delegate various other miscellaneous tasks to the department.

Janson was tangentially involved in the implementation Walter Ulbricht's New Economic System (German: Neues Ökonomisches System) (NÖS) reforms, whose new system of economic management required extensive training and retraining of economic cadres. The NÖS failed to raise the economic competitiveness of East Germany and Janson grew to become openly critical of it at the time.

Despite being a Ulbricht appointee, Janson was retained as department head after Erich Honecker deposed Ulbricht in May 1971. Janson attributed this to a meeting with Ulbricht in 1970, at a time when Honecker and his allies already plotted Ulbricht's removal, where Ulbricht sharply attacked his criticism in the presence of Honecker confidant Paul Verner. Despite this, Janson fell into "inner resignation" starting in 1970, seeing the downward spiral of the East German economy and losing the ability to formulate economic policy.

Surprisingly to him, Janson was also kept on by Günter Mittag, chief architect of the NÖS, upon his October 1976 return as Central Committee Secretary for economics. As it later turned out, keeping all heads of the economic departments was a condition set by Honecker for Mittag to return. In November 1976, Janson was also made a member of the recreated Politburo Economic Commission. However, Janson's actual influence had declined significantly due to the increasing centralization of power by Mittag, Janson being left with implementing his directives.

== Later years and death ==
Janson's twenty-eight years in the apparatus of the SED Central Committee ended in December 1989 as a result of the Peaceful Revolution. He struggled to find a job afterwards, being rejected twenty times. He eventually found employment as a doorman and later cashier at an East Berlin grocery store in February 1990.

In 1991, he published a book titled "Totengräber der DDR. Wie Günter Mittag den SED-Staat ruinierte." (English: Gravediggers of the GDR. How Günter Mittag ruined the SED state.), critically describing Günter Mittag's absolute rule over the East German command economy.

Janson retired in 1993 and died on 23 September 2015 in Berlin at the age of 83.
