= Hubert Egemann =

German politician

Head of the Transport and Communications Department of the Central Committee
- In office 18 April 1962 – 14 April 1987
- Secretary: Günter Mittag; Werner Krolikowski; Günter Mittag
- Deputy: Manfred Calov; Dieter Zobel; Heinz Klemke
- Preceded by: Volkmar Winkler
- Succeeded by: Dieter Wösterfeld

Personal details
- Born: 29 August 1929 Karlsgrund, Province of Upper Silesia, Free State of Prussia, Weimar Republic (now Nowa Bogacica, Poland)
- Died: 25 July 1992 (aged 62)
- Party: Socialist Unity Party (1948–1989)
- Education: Deutsche Verwaltungsakademie (Dipl.-Staatswiss.)
- Occupation: Party Functionary; Railwayman
- Awards: Patriotic Order of Merit, 1st class; Banner of Labor

Hubert Egemann (born Karlsgrund, Kreuzburg 29 August 1929: died 25 July 1992) was a German politician. He served the central committee of East Germany's ruling (SED (party) as the Head of two related departments covering (1) Traffic and networks and (2) Transport and Communications.

== Life ==
Hubert Egemann was born in the Karlsgrund quarter of Kreuzburg in the western part of Upper Silesia, to a working-class family. His education included attendance at senior school. In 1945 the frontier between Poland and Germany moved west and Egemann was one of the millions of Germans obliged to relocate as part of this militarily and politically driven process, ending up in the Soviet occupation zone of Germany which was in the process of becoming the German Democratic Republic (East Germany). In 1946 Egemann relocated to Aschersleben in Saxony-Anhalt and undertook a period of practical work-related training before accepting a job with what was becoming the East German Railway organisation (DDR).

In 1948 he joined the Socialist Unity Party of Germany (SED / Sozialistische Einheitspartei Deutschlands). Between 1950 and 1953 he studied successfully for a diploma in public administration at the Walter Ulbricht German Administration Academy (renamed on more than one occasion) in Forst Zinna, which marked him out as a high-flyer in terms of government service. From 1953/54 he was an Operation Assistant in the Ministry for Railways, also heading up the freight traffic department at the DDR Main Office in Aschersleben.

Between 1954 and 1987, for more than thirty years, Egemann sat as a member on the Central Committee of The Party: from 1958 he was section leader, and from 1960 deputy Department Head, and then from 1962 till 1987 as Chief of the Central Committee departments covering Traffic and networks and Transport and Communications.

== Publications ==
- Die Zusammenarbeit der DDR und der UdSSR im Rahmen des RGW und die Aufgaben des Transportwesens der DDR. In: DDR-Verkehr, Vol 10 (1974), page 401ff.
- Der Beitrag des Transportwesens zur weiteren Lösung der Hauptaufgabe. In: Einheit, Publication year 33 (1978), Vol 11, pages 1145–1161.
- Der Einfluß des Transport- und Nachrichtenwesens auf die volkswirtschaftliche Effektivität. Zentralinstitut für sozialistische Wirtschaftsführung at the Central Committee of the SED, Berlin-Rahnsdorf 1978.

== Awards ==
- Artur Becker Medal in Gold (1967)
- Przodujący kolejarz (PRL) (1968)
- Patriotic Order of Merit in Bronze, in Silver (1969) and in Gold (1975)
- Patriotic Order of Merit Gold Clasp (1989)
- Kampforden „Für Verdienste um Volk und Vaterland“ (1975)
- Banner of Labor (1979)
- German Railways Service Medal
- German Railways Service Award
