= Ilse Stephan =

East German interpreter and party functionary (1931–1984)

Head of the General Department Working Group of the Central Committee
- In office 16 April 1981 – 19 June 1984
- Secretary: Hermann Axen
- Preceded by: Werner Albrecht
- Succeeded by: Position abolished

Personal details
- Born: Ilse Korth; 8 May 1931 Hamburg, Weimar Republic (now Germany)
- Died: 25 June 1984 (aged 53) East Berlin, East Germany
- Cause of death: Suicide by hanging
- Resting place: Friedrichsfelde Central Cemetery
- Party: Socialist Unity Party (1956–1984)
- Education: CPSU Higher Party School "W. I. Lenin"
- Occupation: Interpreter; Party Functionary

Ilse Stephan (née Korth; 8 May 1931 – 25 June 1984) was an East German interpreter and party functionary of the Socialist Unity Party (SED).

Stephan, whose stepfather was a communist functionary, emigrated to the Soviet Union after Adolf Hitler's rise to power. Her stepfather became a victim of the Great Purge and she was deported to the Kazakh SSR.

She returned to East Germany in 1955, where she became an interpreter and party functionary for the Central Committee of the SED. One of only a handful of women in the SED's nomenklatura, Stephan rose to head the Central Committee's General Department Working Group in 1981 and served as Erich Honecker's chief interpreter.

Stephan was fired in 1984 after making critical remarks regarding tensions between the leadership of the Communist Party of the Soviet Union and the SED and committed suicide shortly thereafter.

== Life and career ==
=== Early life and family ===
Stephan was born in Hamburg on 8 May 1931 as Ilse Korth. Her stepfather was Heinrich "Heino" Meyer, a teacher and local functionary of the Communist Party of Germany (KPD) in Hamburg.

After Hitler came to power, Meyer was arrested in December 1932 and Korth, under the cover name "Gerda Zinke", emigrated with her mother to the Soviet Union in December 1933. Meyer was released from a concentration camp in 1934, after which he too emigrated to the Soviet Union, where he, like many other members of the exiled KPD leadership in Moscow, became a victim of the Great Purge. Korth was deported from Moscow to Pachta Aral in the southernmost Kazakh SSR in 1941. After attending school, she worked as an electrical mechanic at a sovkhoz in Pachta Aral from 1948 to 1955. Korth eventually married, taking on the name Ilse Löffler, and had a son in 1953. Her application to become a Soviet citizen was rejected on 10 June 1947.

=== Career in East Germany ===
In 1955 and 1956, most remaining German communists and their families that had fled to the Soviet Union (referred to as "Politemigranten" by the SED) where repatriated back to Germany. Ilse Korth, as she was now known again, returned to what was now East Germany in October 1955 with her widowed mother and began working as a Russian language interpreter. She applied to join the ruling Socialist Unity Party (SED) in November of the same year. She, now remarried as Ilse Stephan, was accepted by the Central Committee Secretariat as a full party member in October 1956.

She became an employee of the General Department of the Central Committee of the SED, the SED's liaison office to the CPSU, among other things translating CPSU publications. From 1971 to 1972, she attended a one-year course at the CPSU Higher Party School "W. I. Lenin" in Moscow. Stephan, who was as fluent in Russian as in German, eventually rose to become Erich Honecker's chief interpreter.

When fellow Soviet emigrant Werner Albrecht retired as head of the General Department in 1981, Stephan succeeded him after the 10th Party Congress in April. She only held the rank of a deputy department head as the General Department was simultaneously downgraded to the "General Department Working Group".

=== Downfall and death ===
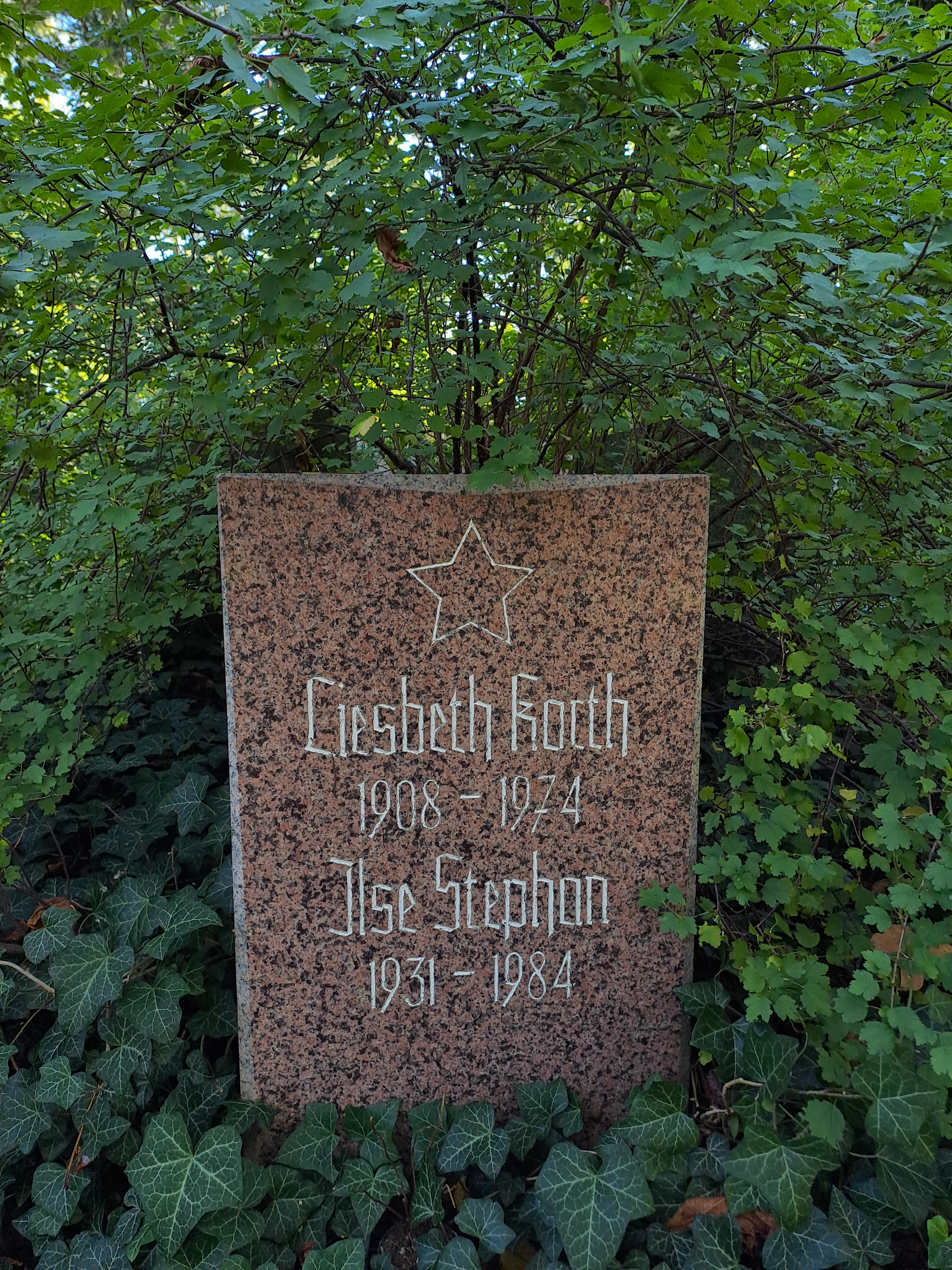
Stephan's grave in 2025

Stephan eventually found herself caught in the increasing tensions between the CPSU and the SED. Honecker accused her of being at fault for these tensions for allegedly mistranslating during a June 1984 visit to CPSU General Secretary Konstantin Chernenko, something disputed by both herself and others present.

In the weeks prior, Stephan had already voiced her frustrations about these tensions privately to Manfred Uschner, personal assistant to Hermann Axen, the Central Committee Secretary responsible for her working group, saying she would tell the Soviets about the inner problems of the SED if things went on as they were. Uschner has since alleged that these conversations were secretly recorded by the Stasi. Uschner has also called her "a great admirer of Mikhail Gorbachev".

Honecker immediately ordered Axen to dismiss her. She was dismissed as working group head on 19 June 1984 following a decision by the Central Committee. A week later, on 25 June 1984, she committed suicide by hanging. In her suicide note, immediately confiscated by the Stasi, she attacked both Honecker and Axen. After her death, the General Department Working Group was abolished and integrated into the International Relations Department as a new interpreter/translator sector.

She was buried in Friedrichsfelde Central Cemetery alongside her mother.
