= Günther Wyschofsky =

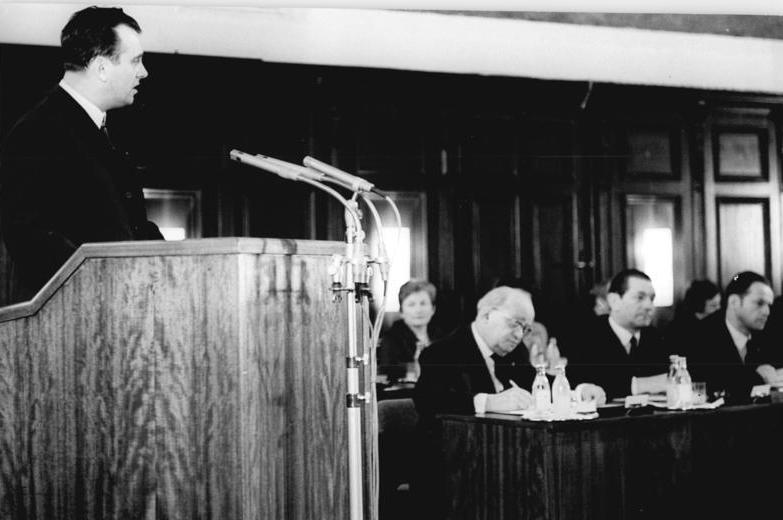
- Wyschofsky in 1970

Minister for the Chemical Industry
- In office 5 May 1966 – 18 November 1989
- Chairman of the Council of Ministers: Willi Stoph; Horst Sindermann; Willi Stoph
- Preceded by: Siegbert Löschau
- Succeeded by: Position abolished

Head of the Basic Industries Department of the Central Committee
- In office 11 November 1959 – 1962
- Secretary: Erich Apel; Günter Mittag
- Deputy: Berthold Handwerker; Heinz Meyer
- Preceded by: Berthold Handwerker
- Succeeded by: Karl-Heinz Schäfer

Personal details
- Born: May 8, 1929 (age 97) Bischofswerda, Saxony, Weimar Republic
- Party: Socialist Unity Party (1946–1989); Communist Party of Germany (1945–1946)
- Education: Dresden University of Technology; Karl-Marx University; "Karl Marx" Party Academy
- Occupation: Politician; Party Functionary; Industrial Chemist
- Awards: Patriotic Order of Merit, 1st class; Banner of Labor; Order of Karl Marx
- Central institution membership: 1964–1989: Full member, Central Committee; 1963–1964: Full member, Central Committee; Other offices held: 1959–1962: Deputy Head, Basic Industries Department of the Central Committee

Günther Wyschofsky (born 8 May 1929 in Bischofswerda) is a former politician and official in the German Democratic Republic. He became a member of the powerful Central Committee of the country's ruling Socialist Unity Party in 1964. For more than two decades he also served as junior Minister for the Chemicals Industry.

== Life ==
Günther Wyschofsky was born in Bischofswerda, a small industrial town in Upper Lusatia in then southern part of what was then Central Germany, and some 20 km (12 miles) from the frontier with the republic of Czechoslovakia, established slightly more than a decade before his birth. His father was a baker and confectioner who lost his job during the economic crisis of the 1920s and had joined the Communist Party (KPD) before 1933. His mother worked as a glass maker.

He left school aged 14, at the height of the war, and undertook a training as a laboratory technician and pharmacist, after which he used his training professionally, working in Bischofswerda and nearby in Bautzen. The war ended in May 1945 which put an end to one-Party government. Wyschofsky joined the Communist Party. The next year, in April 1946 the contentious merger between the old Communist Party and the Moderate-left SPD created the precondition for a return to one-party rule, this time under Soviet administration across the whole of what was now the Soviet occupation zone in what remained of Germany. Wyschofsky was one of thousands of former Communists who now lost no time in signing their membership over to the new Socialist Unity Party (Sozialistische Einheitspartei Deutschlands, SED). Between 1946 and 1948 he pursued his studies at the Workers' and Farmers' Faculty (ABF / Arbeiter-und-Bauern-Fakultät) in Halle. Next he studied Chemistry at the Dresden University of Technology and at the Karl-Marx University (as it was then known) in Leipzig, obtaining his degree in 1951.

He then worked as an industrial chemist, till 1953 heading up the research laboratories at VEB Plastics in Espenhain which was then at the heart of a vast "brown coal" mining area. Between 1953 and 1957 he worked for the Party Central Committee at a national level as an instructor and section leader in the Chemistry division of its Basic Industries Department.

At this stage he was selected for a year of study at the Karl Marx Party Academy, after which in 1958 he returned to working as an official of the Party Central Committee, now as deputy department head for Mining, Coal, Energy and Chemistry. In 1959 he was promoted to the Headship of the Basic Industries Department for the Party Central Committee. That job lasted to 1962 when he was again promoted, now becoming Deputy President and Head of the Chemistry Planning department of the State Planning Commission. In May 1966 Wyschofsky was appointed Minister for the Chemicals Industry in succession to Siegbert Löschau who fell out of favour that year on account of his "inappropriate behaviour". Wyschofsky himself retained this ministerial post for more than twenty years, till November 1989 and the resignation of the Stoph government.

The constitution of the country was closely modeled on that of the Soviet Union, and insisted on the leading role of The Party. Government Ministers held their posts at the pleasure of The Party and their job was to carry out The Party Central Committee decisions. Potential tensions arising from this situation were reduced by the fact that many ministers were also members of the Party Central Committee. Günther Wyschofsky was listed as a candidate for membership in January 1963, and after a wait of less than two years was elected one of the approximately 121 members of the Central Committee in December 1964. Later he was also Chairman, for the East German side, in the bilateral Economic Committees of the German Democratic Republic with Iran and with China.

Wyschofsky period in office saw the construction or massive expansion of several major industrial facilities that nearly half a century later are still important facilities in their respective sectors. These include the vast Petro-chemicals facility in Schwedt, the second refinery at Leuna and the extended adhesives plant at Piesteritz. On the other hand there were other less prestigious Chemicals plants which were left to deteriorate because the larger high-profile "beacon" facilities absorbed all the available investment capital. He often found himself torn between insights deriving from his own expertise and the strictures of party discipline. With Wyschofsky it was always party discipline that won.

Publication

In 2004 Günther Wyschofsky published a book entitled "Questions to a Contemporary witness" ("Fragen an einen Zeitzeugen"), derived from his day to day experiences in government. It dealt with the political context for the political and economic problems of the former German Democratic Republic.

1990, the year of German reunification, was also the year in which Günther Wyschofsky took early retirement. He returned to live in Bischofswerda.

== Awards and honours ==
- 1960 Patriotic Order of Merit in Bronze
- 1964 Banner of Labor
- 1970 Patriotic Order of Merit in Silver
- 1974 Distinguished Service Medal of the National People's Army
- 1977 Honoured Chemical Worker
- 1979 Patriotic Order of Merit in Gold
- 1984 Patriotic Order of Merit Gold clasp
- 1984 Honorary doctorate of the "Carl Schorlemmer" Technical Academy (Leuna-Merseburg)
- 1989 Order of Karl Marx
