= Hermann Pöschel =

German politician (1919–2007)

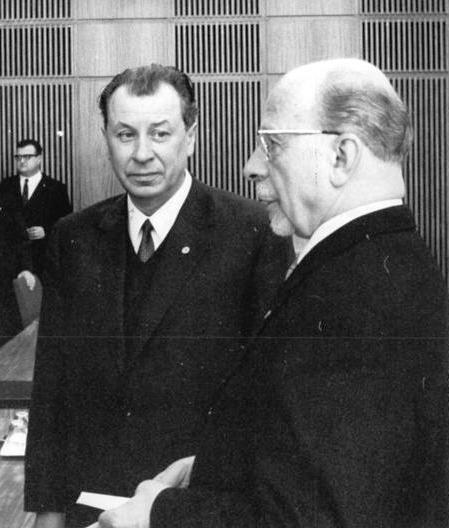
- Pöschel (left) with Walter Ulbricht in 1970

Head of the Research and Technical Development Department of the Central Committee (Note: Working Group for Research, Technical Development and Investment Policy until 1967)
- In office 31 July 1958 – 3 December 1989
- Secretary: Günter Mittag; Erich Apel; Günter Mittag; Werner Krolikowski; Günter Mittag; Wolfgang Rauchfuß
- Deputy: Karl-Heinz Kuntsche
- Preceded by: Position established
- Succeeded by: Position abolished

Personal details
- Born: 28 September 1919 Zeitz, Province of Saxony, Free State of Prussia, Weimar Republic (now Saxony-Anhalt, Germany)
- Died: 30 December 2007 (aged 88) Berlin, Germany
- Party: Socialist Unity Party (1946–1989)
- Other political affiliations: Social Democratic Party (1945–1946)
- Occupation: Politician; Party Functionary
- Awards: Patriotic Order of Merit, 1st class; Banner of Labor; Kampforden „Für Verdienste um Volk und Vaterland“; Order of Karl Marx
- Central institution membership: 1967–1989: Full member, Central Committee; 1963–1967: Candidate member, Central Committee; Other offices held: 1956–1958: Deputy Head, Mechanical Engineering Department of the Central Committee

Hermann Pöschel (28 September 1919 – 30 December 2007) was a politician and an important official in the German Democratic Republic's ruling Socialist Unity Party (SED / Sozialistische Einheitspartei Deutschlands).

Between 1967 and 1989 he was a member of the Party Central Committee.

== Life ==
Hermann Pöschel was born in Zeitz a few weeks after the formal ending of the German Revolution of 1918–19. Zeitz was a small industrial town in the south of Prussia (today near the southern tip of Saxony-Anhalt). Sources describe Pöschel's father as an "unskilled worker" ("ungelernter Arbeiter"). The boy left school in 1935 and embarked on an industrial apprenticeship. In 1938 he progressed to the Technical Academy in Magdeburg where he remained till 1940. From a German perspective, war returned in 1939 which opened up employment opportunities in defence related sectors of the economy, and in 1940, the year of his twenty-first birthday, Hermann Pöschel took a job in Dessau as a research engineer with the Junkers Aircraft Company. He stayed with Junkers till 1945.

War ended in May 1945 with Dessau now included in the Soviet occupation zone of what remained of Germany. Pöschel was employed in industry as a fitter, as a foreman and as a section leader. The outbreak of peace also ended the Nazi regime and, as it seemed, signalled an end to one-party dictatorship. In 1945 Hermann Pöschel joined the Social Democratic Party (SPD). The next year, however, in April 1946 the authorities prepared the way for a return to one-party government with the contentious merger, in the Soviet occupation zone, of the SPD with what till then was the Communist Party. Pöschel was one of many thousand members of the "old" parties who lost no time in signing their party memberships over to the new Socialist Unity Party (SED). After that, between 1946 and 1950 he was employed as a technical director in the Publicly owned Baby buggy enterprise in Zeitz. In October 1949 the Soviet occupation zone was reinvented as the German Democratic Republic, a Soviet sponsored separate version of Germany with its constitutional arrangements modeled, increasingly overtly, on those of the Soviet Union itself. 1951 Hermann Pöschel undertook a study period at the Regional Party Academy, which was the route to a political career. After that, briefly, he was employed as a department head in the state government of Saxony-Anhalt. Between 1952 and 1953 he worked for the regional council of the newly created Halle region (the southern 40% of Saxony-Anhalt).

In 1953 he switched from regional government to a national post with the ruling Sociality Unity Party (SED) where he became an instructor in the Department for Mechanical Engineering and Metallurgy of the Party Central Committee. The country's constitutional arrangements, based on those created by Lenin for the Soviet Union, placed stress on the "leading role" of the ruling party. Government ministers carried out party decisions, and the Party Central Committee was the party's controlling element (except when a Party Congress was in session). Working for the central committee therefore placed Pöschel at the heart of the East German power structure. In 1954 he was promoted from the position of instruction to that of section leader, and in 1956 he was made deputy head of department. Between 1958 and 1961 he headed up the Central Committee's Working Commission on Research, Technological development and Investment policy. After that he became, in 1961, head of the Central Committee Department for Research and Technological Development. It was a function he would retain till 1989, his 28-year tenure was the second longest achieved by any of the thirteen departmental heads reporting in to the Central Committee.

In 1963 Pöschel's own name appeared on the candidate list for membership of the Party Central Committee. After a conventional wait, in 1967 Hermann Pöschel became one of the (by this time) 131 Central Committee members. Once on the committee, like most of its members, he remained a member until the end of 1989 which was when the Central Committee dissolved itself as one of a succession of events which amounted to the demise of the German Democratic Republic as a standalone state and led, in October 1990, to German reunification.

During the 1970s The Party became increasingly troubled by the abundance of black-market articles (silk scarves, women's sweaters, denim clothing, gas lighters, LPs, chewing gum and lollipops) from Poland appearing in East Germany. A fellow Central Committee member, Hermann Axen was mandated to research counter-measures to be undertaken against black-marketeering, while Pöschel was given the task of identifying how the goods in question could be produced and sourced from the country's own factories.

On 26 May 1981 Pöschel was appointed a member of the influential Cadre Commission of the Party Central Committee. The Commission, which dealt with personnel decisions, comprised a handful of departmental chiefs along with the First Secretary, Erich Honecker, himself.

== Awards and honours ==
- 1962 Patriotic Order of Merit in bronze
- 1963 Banner of Labor
- 1964 Patriotic Order of Merit in silver
- 1969 Banner of Labor (Unusually, he won it twice.)
- 1975 Patriotic Order of Merit in gold
- 1975 Battle Order "For services to The People and The Fatherland"
- 1979 Patriotic Order of Merit gold clasp
- 1981 Battle Order "For services to The People and The Fatherland" (again)
- 1984 Order of Karl Marx
- 1989 Patriotic Order of Merit in gold (again)
