= Edwin Schwertner =

German-Czech politician (1932–2016)

Head of the Office of the Politburo
- In office June 1986 – 3 December 1989
- General Secretary: Erich Honecker; Egon Krenz
- Preceded by: Gisela Glende
- Succeeded by: Position abolished

Personal details
- Born: 11 February 1932 Liberec, Czechoslovakia
- Died: 23 March 2016 (aged 84)
- Party: Socialist Unity Party (1949–1989)
- Education: Humboldt University of Berlin (Dr. rer. oec.)
- Occupation: Party Functionary
- Awards: Patriotic Order of Merit, 2nd class; Banner of Labor

Edwin Schwertner (11 February 1932 – 23 March 2016) was a German-Czech economist and party functionary of the Socialist Unity Party (SED).

Schwertner served as the head of the powerful Office of the Politburo during the latter half of the 1980s.

== Life and career ==
=== Early career ===
Schwertner, the son of a weaver, attended elementary and secondary school, completing his Abitur (university entrance qualification).

He moved to the Soviet occupation zone after the war, where he joined the Free German Youth (FDJ) in 1946 and the ruling Socialist Unity Party (SED) in 1949.

From 1950 to 1953, he studied economics at Humboldt University of Berlin, where he subsequently worked as a research assistant and aspirant (doctoral candidate) until 1958. In 1959, he earned his doctorate (Dr. rer. oec.) in economics.

From 1960, he was the SED party secretary in the Faculty of Veterinary Medicine.

=== SED Central Committee ===
In 1960, Schwertner joined the apparatus of the Central Committee of the SED. He initially joined the Science Department of the Central Committee as a political staffer, rising to become a sector head in 1969 and deputy head of the department in March 1977. The Science Department formulated the SED's policy on science and higher education and controlled their implementation and the "leading role of the party" through the party organizations at universities and scientific institutions.

In June 1986, Schwertner was promoted to become the head of the Office of the Politburo with the rank of a department head, succeeding Gisela Glende. Longtime head Glende officially went into retirement, but was actually pushed out by Erich Honecker due to her close contacts with his deposed rival Konrad Naumann.

The Politburo's Office was among the most powerful offices of the Central Committee apparatus, preparing the meetings and keeping minutes of the Politburo. The Politburo's Office additionally prepared party congresses and meetings of the Central Committee and held control over access to foreign literature, travel, classified documents, the Central Committee building and associated services such as the government hospital in Berlin-Buch.

Schwertner was awarded the Patriotic Order of Merit in Bronze in 1971, in Silver in 1982 and the Banner of Labor in 1986.

=== Peaceful Revolution ===
His tenure ended during the Peaceful Revolution with the resignation of the Central Committee and the Politburo on 3 December 1989. Following this, he joined the newly formed Working Committee for the Preparation of the Extraordinary Party Congress, which prepared the party's transition to the Party of Democratic Socialism (PDS). The Politburo's Office was dissolved by the General Department of the Party Executive of the SED-PDS in December 1989.

Schwertner remained active in the PDS, joining its controversial "Council of Elders" advisory board under chairwoman Gabi Zimmer in 2001.

He died in early 2016 at the age of 84.
