= Association of Gardeners, Settlers, and Animal Breeders =

Association of Gardeners, Settlers, and Animal Breeders VKSK
- Verband der Kleingärtner, Siedler und Kleintierzüchter
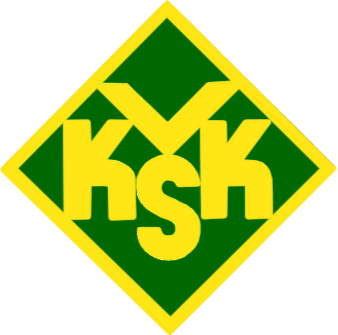
- Predecessor: Kleingartenhilfe des FDGB e. V.
- Successor: Bundesverband der Kleingartenvereine Deutschlands
- Formation: 16 October 1952 (initial); 29 November 1959
- Founded at: Leipzig
- Dissolved: 31 December 1990
- Headquarters: East Berlin
- Location: East Germany
- Members: 1.500.000
- First Secretary: Erich Angermann (1959–1968); Heinz Schmidtke (1968–1976); Erich Wegner (1976–1990)
- Main organ: Central Board
- Parent organization: Agriculture Department of the Central Committee of the SED

The Association of Gardeners, Settlers, and Animal Breeders was a mass organization of the German Democratic Republic from 1959 until shortly after German reunification in 1990. The association worked to assist and improve the economic stances of allotment gardeners and small animal breeders, such as dogs and goats.

Initially founded in 1953, its creation was rejected by the ruling Socialist Unity Party, and it took another six years for the organization to be officially consecrated.

In 1988, the association had over 1.5 million members, and it was officially dissolved on 31 December 1990, two months after reunification.

== See also ==
- National Front (East Germany)
- Peasants Mutual Aid Association
