= Gesellschaft zur Verbreitung wissenschaftlicher Kenntnisse =

The Gesellschaft zur Verbreitung wissenschaftlicher Kenntnisse (Society for the dissemination of scientific knowledge) was an association, founded 17 June 1954 in the Cultural Centre of the VEB Oberspree cable factory in East Berlin, which existed until 1990 in the German Democratic Republic (GDR), and whose objective was to enlighten the GDR population, particularly in the fields of science, technology, medicine, economics and other areas of social sciences. From January 1966, it had the alternate name Urania, which was often used as a nickname.

The founding President was the botanist Werner Rothmaler. In his opening address he referred the long-established and valuable traditions of the popularization of science and technology and mentioned as forerunners Ernst Moritz Arndt, the brothers Grimm, Ernst Haeckel, Alexander von Humboldt, Robert Koch, Karl Marx and Friedrich Engels. Following their lead, science should not be understood as purposeless. Instead, the connection between theory and practice should be achieved through new ways of disseminating scientific knowledge, which is why scientifically sound, generally understood presentation and the timeliness of the topic were established as the basis for the work of the society. He called for more scientists and practitioners to become members, to ensure a good supply of lectures and essays in the newly founded popular science magazines published by the Society.

The society worked primarily for a comprehensible dissemination of scientific knowledge and new technologies, and the popularization of science. For this purpose it used broadcasts, on television and on the GDR youth radio station DT64, for example, under the headings "Urania" and "New TV Urania". In addition, it published popular scientific journals and was training provider for school staffs. It also organized lectures, panel discussions and individual events on relevant topics. Thus it took over important tasks of the community colleges in the GDR. The main publications of the associated Urania-Verlag, which was based first in Berlin and in 1963 in Leipzig, were the series "Urania universe", the magazine "Wissen und Leben" ("knowledge and life") as well as the magazine "Urania", published jointly with the Cultural Association of the GDR.

After the political changes of 1989 and the reunification of Germany, a number of local Urania associations in the former East Germany emerged from the society, and in 1991 they established the "Association of New Urania".

== See also ==
- Urania (Berlin)
