= Kommerzielle Koordinierung =

Secret trade enterprise of East Germany

Kommerzielle Koordinierung (English: Commercial Coordination), or "KoKo" for short, was a secret commercial enterprise in East Germany, run by Stasi officer Alexander Schalck-Golodkowski.

== Origins and development ==
KoKo developed from the official smuggling operations of the 1950s. Its main goal was to bring foreign currency to the German Democratic Republic. It was officially established in 1966 and was involved in business dealings and industrial espionage in Western countries. It is estimated that between 1966 and 1989 it generated nearly 25 billion DM.

== Operations ==
KoKo operated 180 front companies in the West and brought their hard currency profits to secret accounts in East Germany. Its operations were controlled by Erich Honecker, Erich Mielke, and Günter Mittag. KoKo was involved in illegal arms deals with Iran, Third World regimes, and even the CIA; "selling" East German political prisoners to West Germany; purchasing of high technology products despite a Western embargo; selling antique artworks to the West; and importing luxury items for the top nomenklatura of the Socialist Unity Party.

One of the closest Schalck's partners in the West was Bavarian Prime Minister Franz-Josef Strauss. In 1983, they negotiated an agreement under which Western banks provided a one billion DM credit to the German Democratic Republic in return for the easing of restrictions on the travel of East German citizens to the West. West German politician Egon Bahr later said in an interview that this had "worked wonderfully."

Koko was responsible, alongside IMES, for covertly acquiring gear needed for operators of Diensteinheit IX.

== See also ==
- Room 39
