= Haus am Werderschen Markt =

German government office

Coordinates: 52.5140°N 13.3997°E

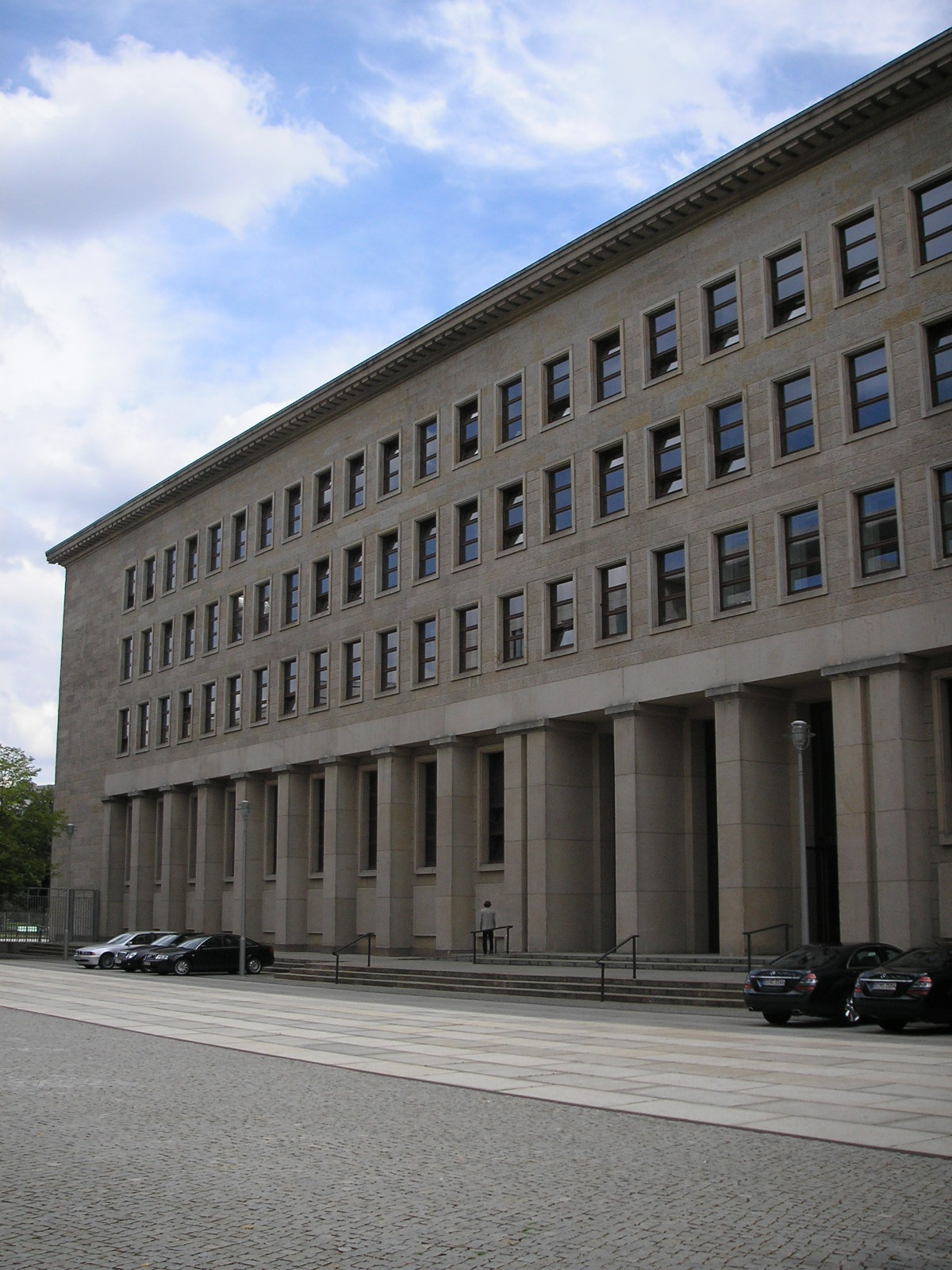
Former Reichsbank building in 2009

The Haus am Werderschen Markt (English: Werder Market House) is a building in Berlin, Germany, originally built in 1934–38 to house the Reichsbank, and today housing part of the Foreign Office.

One of the remaining examples of Nazi architecture, the building was commissioned in 1933. The design competition attracted a number of entrants, including two Bauhaus architects who would later have to flee the Nazis, Walter Gropius and Ludwig Mies van der Rohe. The jury selected Mies van der Rohe's design, but Hitler stepped in and awarded the commission to Heinrich Wolff. Wolff's design called for a stone-faced structure over a reinforced concrete core.

After World War II, the building, now in East Berlin, first housed East Germany's Finance Ministry, and from 1959 the ruling Socialist Unity Party. Following reunification, a new headquarters for the Foreign Office was built next door, and the former Reichsbank building became part of its office complex, undergoing modifications for that purpose overseen by Hans Kollhoff.
