= Attitude (heraldry) =

Orientation and pose of a creature in heraldry

The lion passant guardant, a frequent figure in heraldry, has often been called a leopard by French and English heralds.

In heraldry, the term attitude describes the position in which a figure (animal or human) is emblazoned as a charge, a supporter, or as a crest. The attitude of a heraldic figure always precedes any reference to the tincture of the figure and its parts. Some attitudes apply only to predatory beasts, exemplified by the beast most usual to heraldry – the heraldic lion; other terms apply to docile animals, such as the doe, usually emblazoned as a "hind".

Other heraldic attitudes, such as volant (flying), describe the positions of birds, exemplified by the bird most usual to heraldry – the heraldic eagle; moreover, birds also are described by the positions of their wings. The term naiant (swimming) applies to fish, swans, ducks, and geese. The term segreant is applied to the griffin, as an approximation of rampant, and is applied to the dragon. Animal figures are positioned in profile, facing dexter (the viewer's left), and persons are shown affronté (facing the viewer), but the blazon might specify other attitudes.

== Positions indicating direction ==
Animals and animal-like creatures are presumed to be shown in profile facing dexter. This attitude is standard unless otherwise stated in the blazon. As a warrior will usually carry a shield in the left hand, the animal shown on the shield will then face toward the knight's body. Humans and human-like beings are presumed to be shown affronté. The heraldic terms dexter ('right') and sinister ('left') represent the shield bearer's perspective, not the viewer's.

- To dexter or the viewer's left is the direction animals are presumed to face. This position is thus not specified unless necessary for clarity, as when a human or human-like being is depicted (the default position for these is "affronté") or when an animal's head and body are not turned in the same direction.
- To sinister or contourné (contourny) is said of a creature facing the viewer's right.
- Affronté (/ˌæfrənˈteɪ/) (also affronty, affrontee, affronted, or affrontant) is said of a creature (or other heraldic component such as a helm or the face of a man) that faces the viewer (e.g., of a lion, "affronté-sejant")
- En arrière is said of a creature positioned with its back to the viewer. It is most common used of birds and insects, where the understanding is of an overhead view of the animal with its wings spread (most commonly, "volant en arrière", said of bees). However, also see "recursant" below.
- Guardant or in full aspect indicates an animal with a body positioned sideways but with its head turned to face the viewer.
- Regardant indicates an animal with its head turned backward, as if looking over its shoulder. Unless other instructions are given, the body will face "to dexter", making the head's direction "to sinister" (e.g., "passant reg[u]ardant", "rampant reg[u]ardant", where the first term describes the animal's body position and the second describes the position of its head).
- In trian aspect (a rare, later 16th and 17th century heraldry term) is an animal's head at a three-quarters view and gives the appearance of depth, with the head viewed at an angle somewhere between profile and straight-on.

== Attitudes of beasts ==
Many attitudes commonly met with in heraldic rolls apply specifically to predatory beasts, while others may be better suited to the docile animals. These will each be discussed in detail below.

A blazon may also specify the position of a beast's head, differently coloured parts (such as teeth, claws, tongue, etc.), or the shape or position of its tail. A beast may be "armed" (horns, teeth and claws) or "langued" (tongue) of a tincture, while a stag may be "attired" (antlers) or "unguled" (hooves) of a tincture. The tail may be forked (queue fourchée) or doubled (double-queued). In addition to the below, there may be rare or, arguably, not entirely standard attitudes, such as a snorting bison.

=== Rampant ===
A beast rampant (Old French: "rearing up") is depicted in profile standing erect with forepaws raised. The position of the hind legs varies according to local custom: the lion may stand on both hind legs, braced wide apart, or on only one, with the other also raised to strike; the word rampant is sometimes omitted, especially in early blazon, as this is the most usual position of a carnivorous quadruped. Rampant is the most frequent attitude of quadrupeds, and as supporters they are rarely seen in any other attitude. Forcené is the term for this position when applied to horses or unicorns. A goat in the rampant position is clymant ('climbing').

Note: the term segreant denotes the same position, but implies a particular wing position and is only used in reference to winged quadrupeds such as griffins and dragons.

Lion rampant

Lion rampant guardant

Lion rampant regardant

=== Passant ===
A beast passant (Old French: "striding") walks toward dexter (the viewer's left) with the right forepaw raised and all others on the ground. Early heralds held that any lion in a walking position must necessarily be a "leopard", and this distinction persists in French heraldry; however, this use of the term leopard has long since been abandoned by English heralds. A "Lion of England" denotes a lion passant guardant Or, used as an augmentation. The Welsh flag features a dragon passant. For stags and other deer-like beasts of chase, the term trippant is used instead of passant.

Lion passant

Lion passant guardant

Lion passant regardant

=== Sejant ===
A beast sejant or sejeant (Middle French: seant, siégeant, "sitting") sits on its haunches, with both forepaws on the ground.

A beast sejant erect is seated on its haunches, but with its body erect and both forepaws raised in the "rampant" position (this is sometimes termed "sejant-rampant").

Lion sejant

Lion sejant erect

=== Couchant ===
A beast couchant (Old French: "lying down") is lying down, but with the head raised. Lodged is the term for this position when applied to the "docile" (i.e. herbivorous) animals.

Lion couchant

=== Courant ===
A beast courant (French: "running"; also at speed or in full chase) is running, depicted at full stride with all four legs in the air.

Lion courant

=== Coward ===
A lion coward (Old French coart, cuard, "turning tail") carries the tail between its hind legs and is otherwise shown rampant to dexter; "coward" takes no other modifiers such as "regardant" or "sejant".

Lion coward

=== Dormant ===
A beast dormant (French: "sleeping") is lying down with his head lowered, resting upon the forepaws, as if asleep. (However, perhaps counterintuitively, some sources would have the lion dormant with the eyes open.)

Lion dormant

=== Salient ===
A beast salient (Latin: saliēns, "leaping") (also springing) is leaping, with both hind legs together on the ground and both forelegs together in the air. This is a very rare position for a lion, but is also used of other heraldic beasts. The stag and other herbivorous animals in this position are often termed springing. Certain smaller animals are sometimes blazoned as saltant rather than salient.

Lion salient

=== Statant ===
A beast statant (Old French: "standing") is "standing" (in profile toward dexter), all four feet on the ground, usually with the forepaws together. This posture is more frequent in crests than in charges on shields. In certain animals, such as bears, this may refer to an upright, bipedal position (though this position may also be referred to as statant erect), though bears blazoned as 'statant' can also be found with all four feet firmly on the ground (e.g. in the arms of the former borough council of Berwick-upon-Tweed). While statant is used in reference to predatory beasts, the more docile animals when in this position may be called at bay, while such creatures statant guardant are said to be at gaze. This is particularly true of stags (harts).

Lion statant

Lion statant guardant

Lion statant regardant

=== Morne ===
Also spelled morné or mortine, a lion depicted with no claws, no teeth and no tongue, in the rampant position. The term is from the Old French verb morner, from morne, a ring placed over the point of a lance, from Latin mora, "sword guard".

Lion morne

=== Bailloné ===
A lion bailloné (lit. 'gagged') is shown in the rampant position holding a baton or staff in its teeth.

Lion baillone

=== Defamed ===
Also called diffame, infamed, and defame, a lion shown in the rampant position without its tail.

Lion defamed

=== Disjointed ===
A lion shown with its paws and head (but not its tail) detached from its body is called "disjointed" (i.e., torn away at the joints), and it is always shown in the rampant position.

Lion disjointed

=== Tricorporated ===
A lion tricorporated is shown having three bodies combined with one head, with the main/ central lion facing "rampant guardant" (i.e., with its face towards the viewer and with body upright facing to dexter).

Lion tricorporated

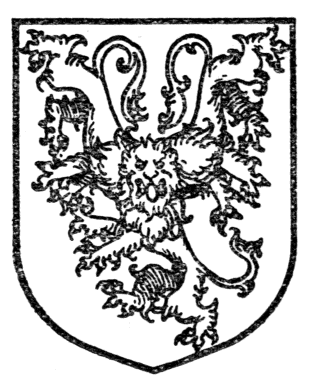
Lion tricorporated, as illustrated in Arthur Charles Fox-Davies' Complete Guide to Heraldry

== Attitudes of herbivores ==
Herbivores are generally "docile" animals like deer, horses, sheep, etc. They use many of the same terms listed under "beasts" above but have several terms that are reserved for non-predatory animals.

=== At Bay ===
Herbivores are described as at bay when they are standing still while looking in the direction their body is positioned (i.e., dexter or sinister). It is the same as statant.

=== At Gaze ===
When herbivores are standing still while looking toward the viewer, it is called at gaze. It is the herbivore version of statant guardant.

=== Forcené ===
When a unicorn, horse or other horse-like animal "rears up" in what the beasts describe as rampant, it is called forcené (forcene, lit. 'rabid'). This term is not used for non-horse-like herbivores.

=== Leaping, Springing ===
Leaping or springing describe docile animals leaping, usually with both hind legs on the ground. These terms can be used interchangeably to describe the beasts' salient attitude for herbivores.

=== Lodged ===
A docile/herbivorous animal, such as a stag or sheep, lying down with head erect is called lodged ("lying down"). This term is used in place of couchant.

=== Pascuant ===
Herbivores can be shown as pascuant ("grazing") or paissant ("peaceful"), with head lowered to the same level as their four legs, as the head of a cow would be when eating grass.

Arms of Ladevèze-Rivière: gules a sheep pascuant

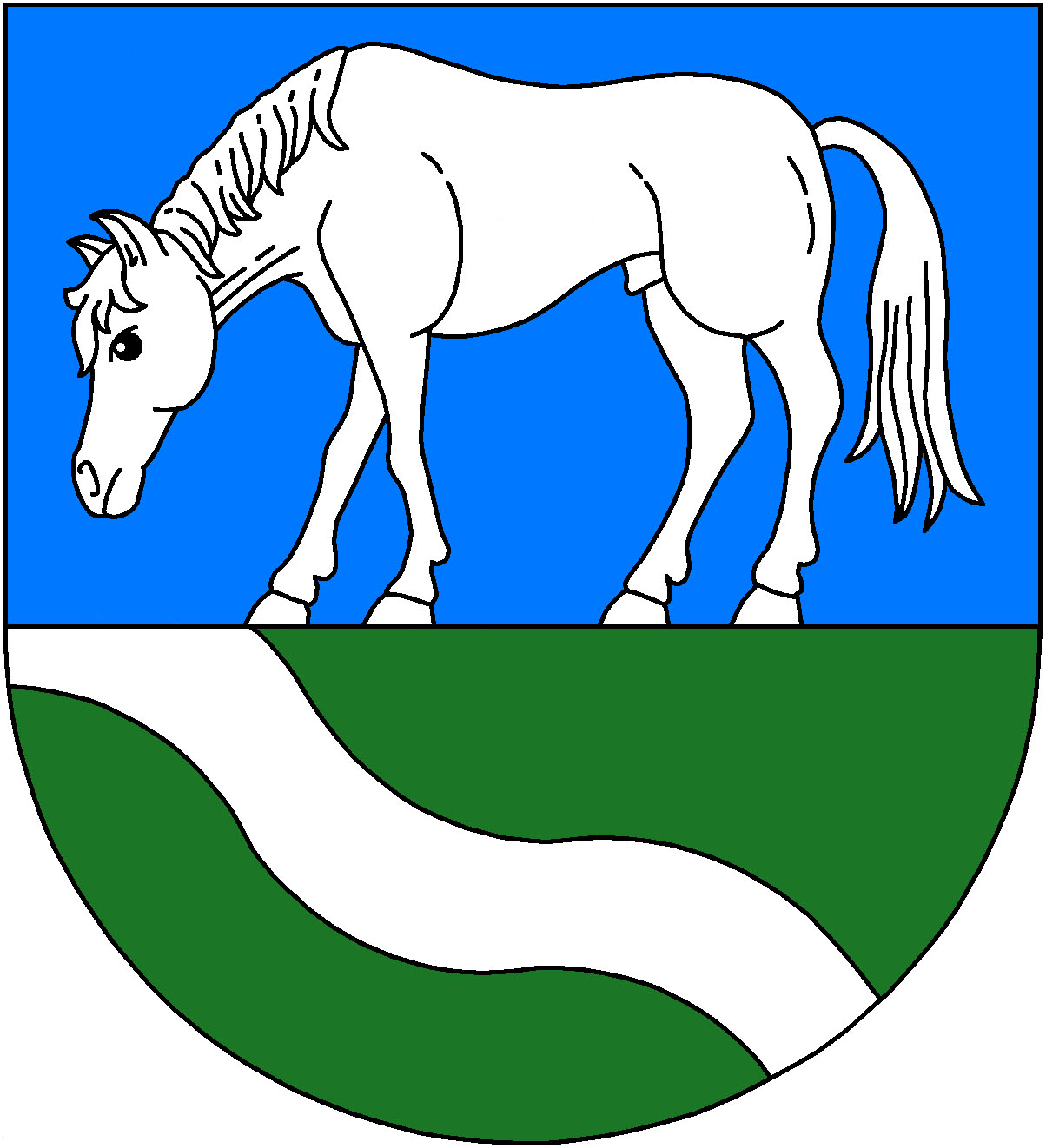
Arms of Hranice, Cheb District, Czech Republic, featuring a horse pascuant argent

Arms of Betpouey, France: vert a sheep pascuant, on a chief azure three fleurs de lys Or

Arms of Saint-André-d'Embrun, France, with a sheep pascuant to sinister

=== Trippant ===
Trippant ("striding") is used to describe stags and other deer-like animals of the chase (prey) in place of passant.

== Attitudes of birds and bats ==
Some attitudes describe the positioning of birds and bats. The eagle is so often found displayed in early heraldry that this position came to be presumed of the eagle unless some other attitude is specified in the blazon. The same applies to bats.

The terms expanded and elevated or abaissé and inverted are similar terms often used interchangeably in heraldry but have specific meanings. There is also sometimes confusion between a rising bird with displayed wings and a displayed bird. The difference is that rising birds face either to the dexter or in trian aspect and have their feet on the ground. Displayed birds face the viewer, have their legs splayed out, and the tail is completely visible.

Several terms refer to the particular position of the wings, rather than the attitude of the bird itself. A bird in nearly any attitude, except overt, may have its wings displayed or addorsed.

- Wings displayed means the bird's right wing is extended forward and its left wing extended rearward, turned so that the undersides of both wings are fully shown.
  - displayed and expanded or espanie / épandre ("expanded") are spread with the wing tips pointing upward.
  - displayed and lowered or abaissé ("lowered") are spread with the wing tips pointing downward.
- Wings addorsed means the wings are raised and spread behind it back-to-back as if about to take flight, so that only the top of the bird's right wing shows behind the fully displayed left wing.
  - addorsed and elevated are raised with the wing tips pointing upward.
  - addorsed and inverted are raised with the wing tips pointing downward.

Wings displayed and expanded	Wings displayed and lowered

Eagle displayed, wings expanded

Phoenix issuant, wings displayed and elevated, coming from her nest of fire

Dove volant (wings addorsed and elevated)

Stork vigilant

=== Displayed ===
A bird displayed is shown affronté with its head turned to dexter and wings spread to the sides to fill the area of the field. This position is presumed of the eagle, and the symbolic use of eagles in this position was well established even before the development of heraldry, going back to Charlemagne.

=== Overt ===
A bird overt ("open") or disclosed has wings open and pointing downward.

=== Close ===
Close ("closed"), the bird's equivalent of statant, is shown in profile and at rest with its feet flat on the ground and its wings folded at its sides. Trussed is the term used for domestic or game birds, implying the bird is tied up or caught in a net respectively, and is not applied to predator birds like the eagle and hawk. Perched is close while sitting atop a charge.

If a bird's attitude is not blazoned, it is assumed to be close; the exception is the eagle, whose default attitude is displayed.

=== Issuant ===
Used to describe a phoenix, though potentially other flying creatures as well, when depicted arising from, for example, a line of flames, a coronet, an amphora, etc.

=== Rising ===
A bird rising, rizant or rousant faces dexter with its head upturned, wings raised, and standing on the tips of its feet as if about to take flight. A bird rising may have its wings described as either displayed or addorsed, and the wings may be further described as elevated or inverted.

=== Striking ===
An attitude similar to rising is the striking position. When striking, the wings are spread in flight with head lowered to look at prey below, legs outstretched, and talons / claws opened to grasp the prey as the bird passed the target. While this may be more common in a bird of prey, it can be used with other birds such as a corvid.

=== Volant ===
A bird volant faces the dexter with its wings spread in flight (usually shown addorsed and elevated) and its legs tucked under its body. Volant en arrière is when the bird is shown from a top-down perspective with the head facing straight ahead, its back to the viewer, and the wings spread in flight (usually shown displayed and inverted). A bird volant is considered in bend ("diagonal") as it is flying from the lower sinister to the upper dexter of the field.

=== Recursant ===
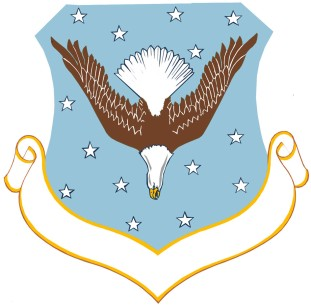
An eagle volant recursant descendant in pale, the emblem of the 38th Air Division of the US Air Force

An eagle or hawk shown recursant has its back towards the viewer, e.g., "an eagle volant recursant descendant in pale" is an eagle flying perpendicularly downward with its back towards the viewer. (See also tergiant below.)

=== Vigilant ===
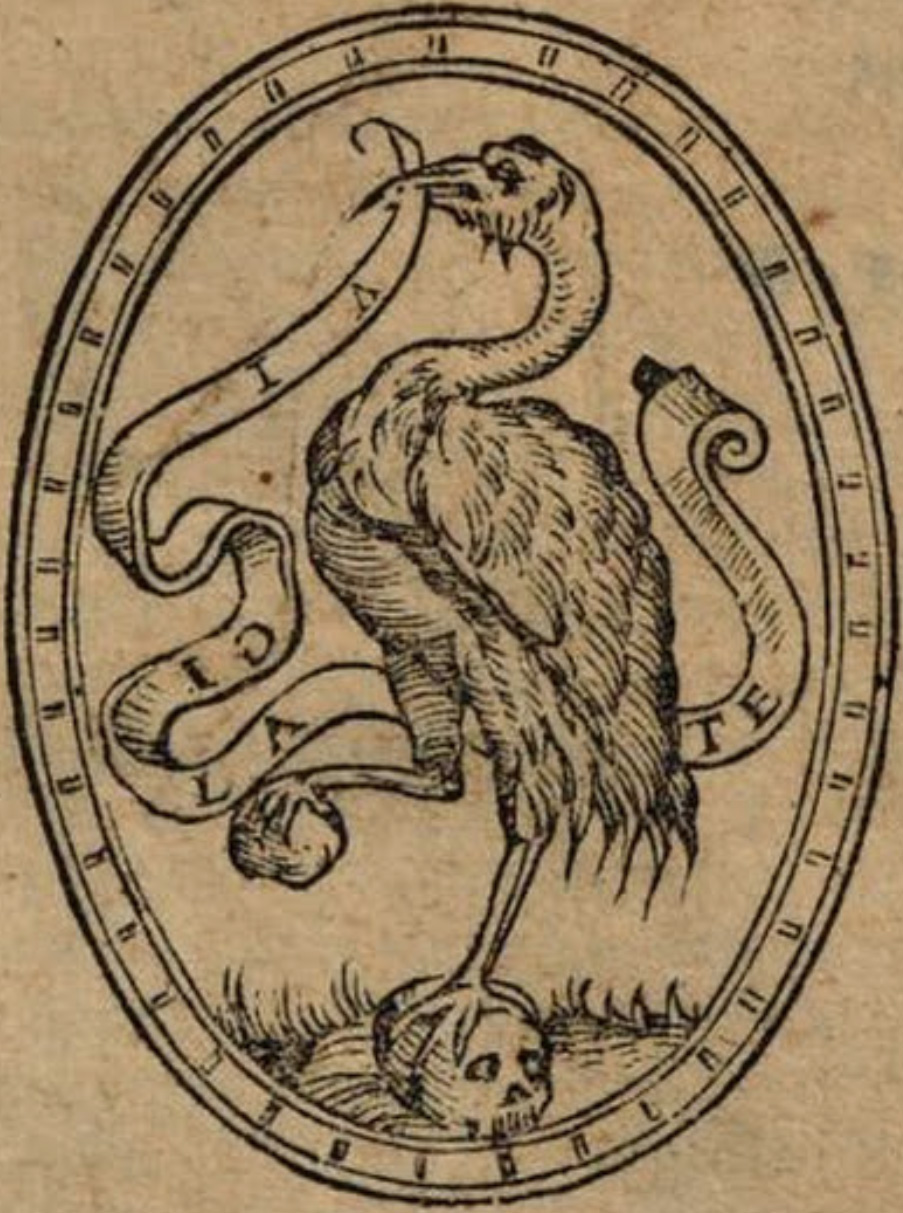
A crane vigilant

A crane standing on one leg (usually with a stone held in the other foot) may be called vigilant or in its vigilance (e.g. Waverley Borough Council's "crane in its vigilance"). A stone is usually shown held in the claw of the raised leg. This is as per the bestiary myth that cranes stayed awake by doing so. If it dozed, the crane would supposedly drop the rock, waking itself up. In heraldry, this does not, however, preclude the depiction of the crane asleep, such as in the arms of Clan Cranstoun, in which case the crane is still termed as being "in its vigilance".

=== Vulning / in her piety ===
A pelican in her piety, wings addorsed and elevated

One peculiar attitude, reserved only to the pelican, is the pelican in her piety. The heraldic pelican, one of the few female beasts in heraldry, is shown with a sharp stork-like beak, which it uses to vuln (pierce or wound) her own breast. This is per the bestiary myth that a female pelican wounded herself thus to feed her chicks. This symbol of sacrifice carries a particular religious meaning (usually a reference to Christ's sacrifice), and became so popular in heraldry that pelicans rarely exist in heraldry in any other position. A distinction is sometimes observed, however, between a pelican vulning herself (alone, piercing her breast) versus "her piety" (surrounded by and feeding her chicks).

== Attitudes of fish ==
=== Embowed ===
A fish or dolphin embowed is depicted with its back curved upwards. Absent other qualifiers, the term "dolphin" represents the animal embowed and naiant. Torqued refers to a fish or dolphin embowed in a vertical position, forming the shape of a letter S. Variant spellings for this term include torquend, torgant, and targant. "Torqued" may also be used to refer to serpents.

=== Hauriant ===
A fish, dolphin, or other sea creature hauriant (Latin hauriēns, "drawing up") is in a vertical position with its head up, as if surfacing for air. The term is only used for finned and swimming creatures; upright shellfish are instead termed simply "erect" or "upright".

=== Naiant ===
A dolphin naiant

An animal or creature naiant is swimming. This term is typically applied to fish (when shown in a horizontal position), but may also apply to other sea creatures and, occasionally, water fowl (i.e. swans, ducks or geese shown without legs). A dolphin blazoned as naiant is always shown as embowed, unlike any other sea creature or monster, even though the blazon may not specify this.

=== Urinant ===
A fish, dolphin, or other sea creature urinant (/ˈjʊərɪnənt/) (Latin ūrīnāns, "diving") is in a vertical position with its head down and the tail erect.

== Attitudes of serpents ==
Terms like glissant and nowed apply to serpents. Serpents also sometimes appear in a circular form, biting their own tail, but this symbol, called an Ouroboros, was imported ready-made into heraldry, and so it needs no term of attitude to describe it.

=== Glissant ===
A serpent glissant is gliding horizontally in an undulant posture.

=== Nowed ===
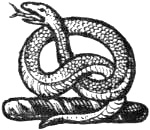
A serpent nowed

Serpents, and the tails of other beasts and monsters, may be nowed (/naʊd/ (French noué, "knotted")—often in a figure-eight knot. Serpents bent to form a spiral or letter S, such as in the Caduceus, are termed annodated.

=== Tergiant ===
Tergiant (and, less often, tergant) is another way to describe recursant where the animal has its back (Latin tergum) to the viewer. It is the default attitude for amphibians, insects, and some reptiles with a low profile, such as a lizard. Tergiant can also be used for birds in place of recursant, though less frequently than the other figures mentioned. It is basically the opposite of affronty.

== Attitudes for mythical winged quadrupeds ==
Few attitudes are reserved to the rarer classes of creatures, but these include segreant, a term which can only apply to winged quadrupeds.

=== Segreant ===
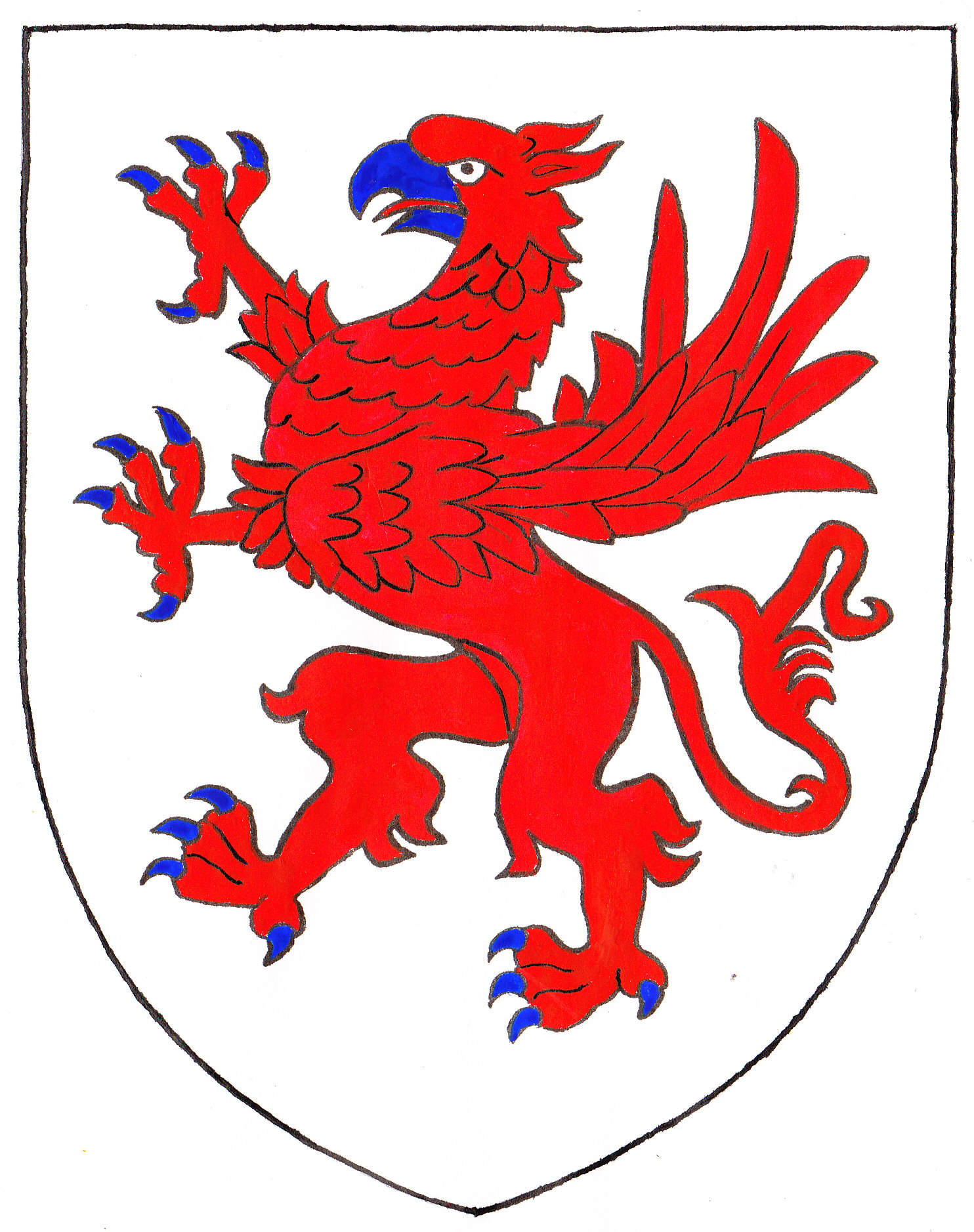
A griphon segreant

A creature segreant has both forelegs raised in the air, as a beast rampant, with wings addorsed and elevated. This term is reserved to winged quadrupeds (such as griffins and dragons). It is of uncertain etymology; it is first recorded as sergreant in the 16th century. Payne Fisher's 1682 Synopsis of Heraldry uses the term segriant, as seen in some blazons.

== Other attitudes ==
=== Combatant or respectant ===
Creatures combatant (French, "fighting") are shown in profile facing each other in the rampant or segreant position, always paired and never appearing singly. Nearly any creature can be rendered combatant, although this term is usually applied to predatory beasts and mythical creatures; herbivorous animals in such a position are typically blazoned as respectant (Latin respectāns, "watching").

=== Addorsed ===
Two goats addorsed

Creatures or objects addorsed or endorsed (Latin ad-, "to" and dorsum, "back"; Middle English endosse, Old French endosser, influenced by Medieval Latin indorsare) are shown facing away from each other. As with combatant, charges addorsed can only appear in pairs. One also frequently finds keys addorsed (placed in parallel, wards facing outward).

Griffin segreant or armed and langued gules

Lions combatant or armed and langued azure

Barbels addorsed or

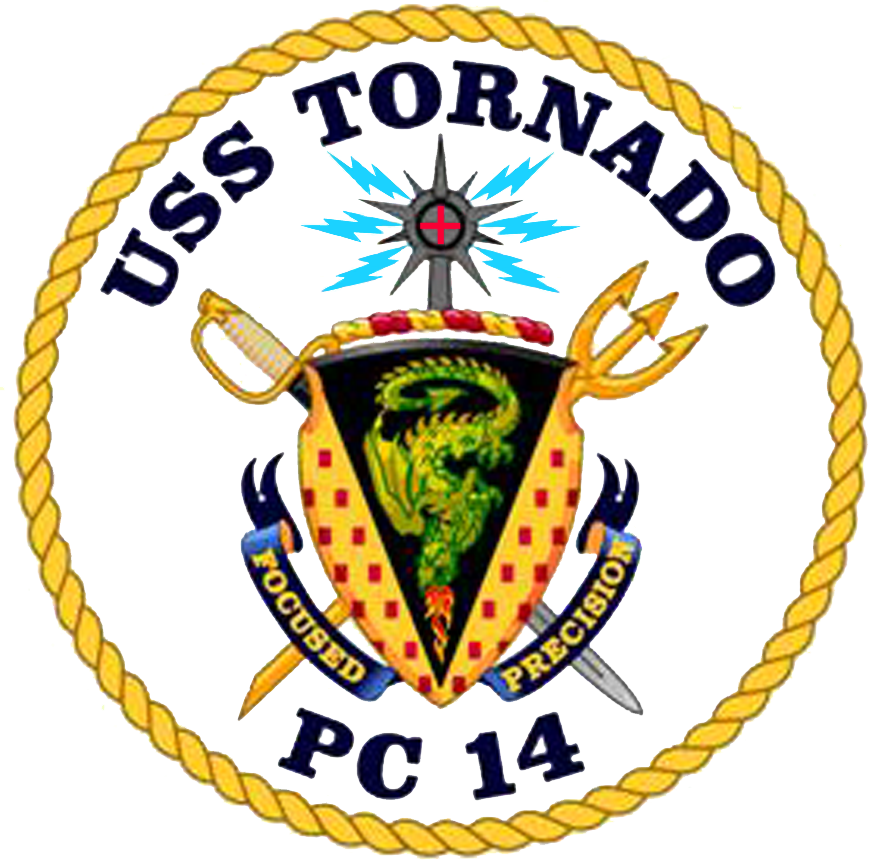
Arms of USS Tornado, with a dragon urinant

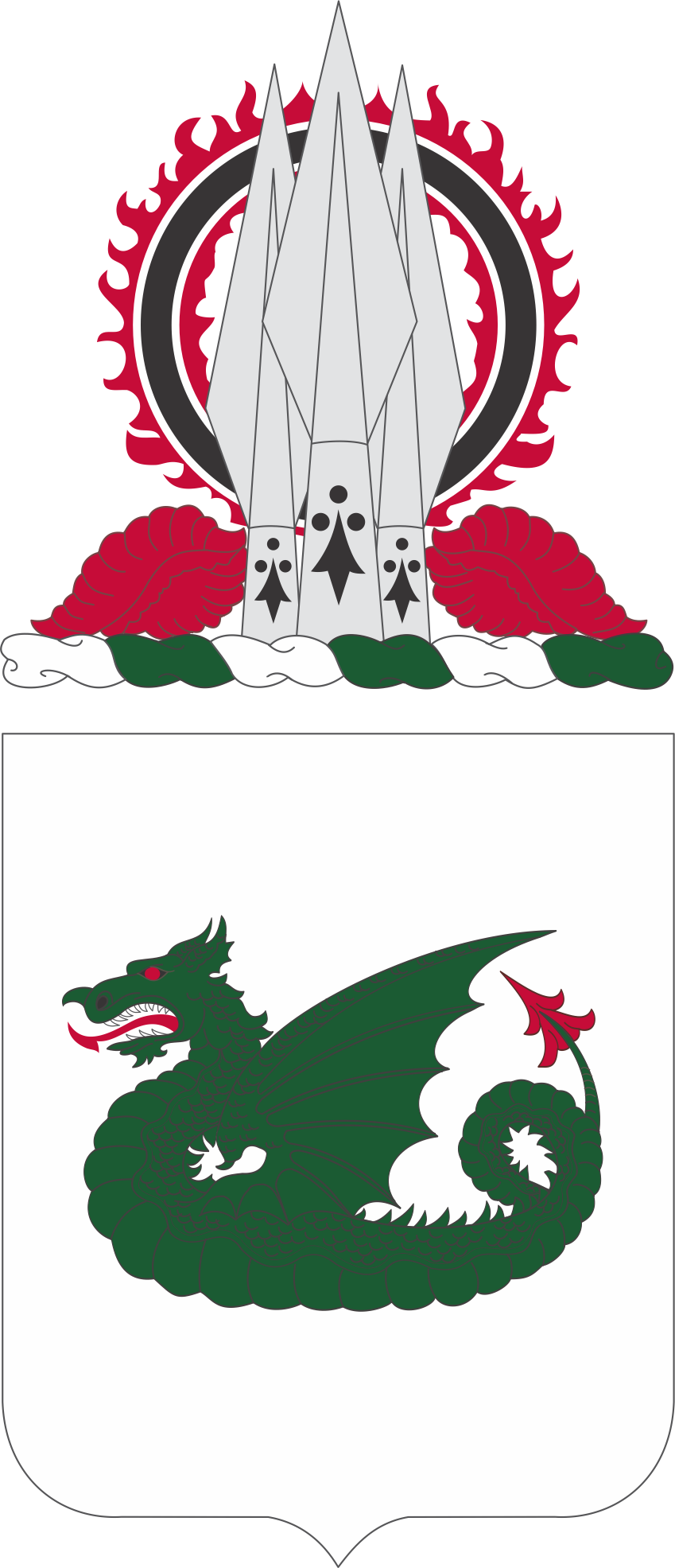
Arms of the 37th Armor Regiment, featuring a wyvern glissant

Dolphin naiant or

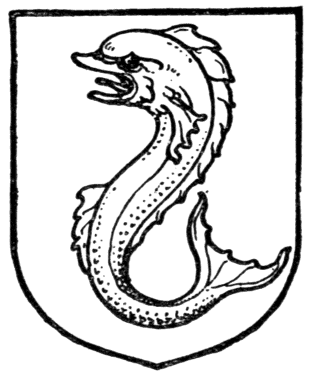
Dolphin haurient argent

Lion or armed argent, langued gules, tail nowed

== Sources ==
- Cussans, John E. (2003). Handbook of Heraldry. Kessinger Publishing. ISBN 0-7661-7338-0. LCCN 04024470 – via Internet Archive.
- Fox-Davies, Arthur Charles (1909). A Complete Guide to Heraldry. New York: Dodge Publishing. LCCN 09023803 – via Internet Archive.
- Fox-Davies, Arthur Charles (1929). A Complete Guide to Heraldry. London: T.C. & E.C. Jack – via Internet Archive. ISBN 0-517-26643-1
- Gough, Henry; Parker, John Henry (1847). A Glossary of Terms Used in British Heraldry. Oxford: John Henry Parker. p. 360.
- Maurer, Maurer, ed. (1983). Air Force Combat Units of World War II. Washington, DC: Office of Air Force History. ISBN 9780-912799025.
- Parker, James (1970) [1894]. A Glossary of Terms Used In Heraldry (New ed.). Oxford and London: James Parker and Co. p. 659.
- Vinycomb, John (1906). Fictitious and Symbolic Creatures in Art, With Special Reference to Their Use in British Heraldry. London: Chapman and Hall, Limited.
