= Emmi =

Emmi may refer to:

== People ==
- Emmi (Australian singer), singer-songwriter and voice of Blind Pig
- Emmi (Finnish singer), a Finnish singer-songwriter
- Emmi Buttykay (1911–1957), a Hungarian actress
- Emmi Dölling (1906–1990), a Czechoslovak/German political activist and journalist
- Emmi Mäkelin (1874–1962), Finnish midwife and politician
- Emmi Welter (1887–1971), German politician
- Emmi Piiroinen (born 2007), Finnish rhythmic gymnast

== Institutions ==
- Emmi AG, Swiss-based milk processor company
- EMMI, European Money markets Institute, is in charge to publish the Euribor daily reference rate
- EMMIs, enemies in the 2021 video game Metroid Dread

== Abbreviations ==
- Cyrix EMMI, Extended Multi-Media Instructions, an MMX extension
