= Josef Hegen =

Czech and German politician

Ambassador of the German Democratic Republic to China
- In office 1961–1964
- Preceded by: Paul Wandel
- Succeeded by: Günter Kohrt

Ambassador of the German Democratic Republic to Poland
- In office 1957–1961
- Preceded by: Stefan Heymann
- Succeeded by: Richard Gyptner

Chairmen of the Magdeburg Bezirk Council
- In office 1952–1953
- Preceded by: position established
- Succeeded by: Paul Hentschel

Personal details
- Born: 23 April 1907 Hunschgrün, Austria-Hungary
- Died: 28 February 1969 (aged 61) East Berlin, German Democratic Republic
- Resting place: Zentralfriedhof Friedrichsfelde
- Party: Socialist Unity Party of Germany (1946–); Communist Party of Czechoslovakia (1923–1946)
- Education: International Lenin School
- Awards: Patriotic Order of Merit, in gold (1967); Patriotic Order of Merit, in silver (1957)

Josef Hegen (23 April 1907 – 28 February 1969) was a Czech and German politician, diplomat and Holocaust survivor.

== Life ==
Hegen was born on 23 April 1907 in Hunschgrün, Austria-Hungary (today non-existent village in the territory of Hory, Czech Republic), the son of a miner. He worked in brickworks and in mining after attending elementary school. In 1924, he joined the Communist Party of Czechoslovakia (KSČ). Between 1927 and 1929, he did military service in the Czechoslovak Army. Between 1930 and 1935 he worked for the Communist Party in Reichenberg. In 1933 he became a member of the Central Committee of the KSČ. In 1934, he was sentenced to two weeks in military prison for refusing to take part in military exercises. From 1935 to 1938 he attended the International Lenin School in Moscow. After his return he was sentenced to six weeks of imprisonment as a deserter. Between 1938 and 1939 he was a part of the KSČ's regional leadership in South Moravia.

Following the total occupation of Czechoslovakia by Nazi Germany, Hegen emigrated to the Soviet Union in 1939, where he worked as a locksmith and mechanic. In 1942 he was trained for partisan duties by the Red Army. In March 1943, he parachuted over occupied Poland, intending to work as a partisan behind German lines. He was subsequently arrested by the Gestapo just a few days later. Initially, he was imprisoned in Kraków, Ostrava, and Brno before being sent to the Mauthausen concentration camp in October 1943.

Following the conclusion of the Second World War, Hegen helped organize the resettlement of Sudeten German refugees who had been expelled from Czechoslovakia. In 1946, he moved to the Soviet occupation zone in Germany and joined the Socialist Unity Party (SED). Between 1946 and 1947 he was part of the SED's regional leadership in Zwickau and southern Saxony.

From December 1948 to March 1950 he headed the Volkspolizei in the state of Saxony-Anhalt, succeeding Wilhelm Zaisser. He then served as Minister of the Interior of Saxony-Anhalt until the reforms in the German Democratic Republic dissolved the state governments in 1952. From 1952 to 1953 he was chairman of the Bezirk Magdeburg. His role in the district administration put him on the frontlines of the uprising of 1953. After the conclusion of the uprising, he was rebuked and accused of capitulation by Walter Ulbricht because Hegen felt compelled to negotiate with representatives of demonstrators.

Hegen served as ambassador of the German Democratic Republic to Poland from March 1957 to February 1961. Hegen was chosen to replace Stefan Heymann due to his reputation as a hardliner within the Socialist Unity Party (SED). Heymann had previously taken a somewhat sympathetic stance to the 1956 Poznań protests, which was not appreciated by Walter Ulbricht and SED leadership. In 1961, Hegen was appointed ambassador to the People's Republic of China, with Richard Gyptner replacing him as ambassador to Poland. In 1964, he would be appointed deputy minister for foreign affairs, with Günter Kohrt succeeding him as ambassador to China.

== Awards ==
- Patriotic Order of Merit, in gold (1967)
- Patriotic Order of Merit, in silver (1957)
