= Johannes König =

German journalist

Ambassador of the German Democratic Republic to Czechoslovakia
- In office 1965–1966
- Preceded by: Walter Vesper
- Succeeded by: Heinz Willmann

Ambassador of the German Democratic Republic to Soviet Union
- In office 1955–1959
- Preceded by: Rudolf Appelt
- Succeeded by: Rudolf Dölling

Ambassador of the German Democratic Republic to Mongolia
- In office 1955–1958
- Preceded by: Rudolf Appelt
- Succeeded by: Johannes Dick

Ambassador of the German Democratic Republic to Vietnam
- In office 1954–1955
- Preceded by: position established
- Succeeded by: Rudolf Pfützner

Ambassador of the German Democratic Republic to North Korea
- In office 1951–1954
- Preceded by: position established
- Succeeded by: Richard Fischer

Ambassador of the German Democratic Republic to China
- In office 1950–1955
- Preceded by: position established
- Succeeded by: Richard Gyptner

Personal details
- Born: 2 April 1903 Arnstadt, German Empire
- Died: 22 January 1966 (aged 62) Prague, Czechoslovakia
- Resting place: Zentralfriedhof Friedrichsfelde
- Party: Socialist Unity Party of Germany (1947–); Communist Party of Germany (1919–1947)
- Awards: Patriotic Order of Merit, in gold (1961); Patriotic Order of Merit, in silver (1955)

Johannes König (2 April 1903 – 22 January 1966) was a German politician, journalist and diplomat. Throughout his career, he served as ambassador of East Germany to China, North Korea, Vietnam, Mongolia, Czechoslovakia, and the Soviet Union.

== Life ==
Johannes König was born in Arnstadt on 2 April 1903. After completing elementary school, he trained as a leather tanner and found work in Altenburg. In 1919, he joined the Communist Party of Germany. Between 1920 and 1924, König held a number of local leadership positions in the party.

Towards the end of 1924, König was employed as a journalist for the Communist Party (KPD). Between 1924 and 1930, he worked at a number of KPD-owned newspapers, spending time as editor-in-chief of the party newspaper in Remscheid, Solingen, and Chemnitz. In September 1926, he married Henny König (née Schwarz). She was from a family of Jewish craftsmen and had been a KPD member since 1922.

In April 1930, König was sentenced to eighteen months imprisonment for conspiracy to commit treason. After his release in September 1931, he returned to journalism; first as head of press for the Revolutionäre Gewerkschafts Opposition, then in his former role as editor-in-chief of the KPD newspaper in Chemnitz.

After the Nazi Party seized power in 1933, König was part of an illegal underground KPD cell from February to May 1933. In May, he was placed into so-called "protective custody", where he remained until October 1934. He was then transferred to a prison camp near Colditz, and then to Sachsenburg concentration camp. After being release, he went to Cologne to reunite with his wife. In February 1936, König was arrested again and was sentenced to twenty months in prison in autumn 1936.

In 1938 his wife Henny König was arrested by the Gestapo. She was ordered to be deported from Germany on account of her Jewish heritage. Since Johannes König refused to separate from his wife, he was later also order to be deported. The couple's apartment was vandalized during Kristallnacht in November 1938; and following continued harassment, they left Germany for Shanghai, China in April 1939.

From September 1941, König worked for the Soviet news agency TASS out of Shanghai, writing news commentaries about political and military events. TASS' operations in Japanese-occupied China were protected by the Soviet–Japanese Neutrality Pact. König also made connections with other German communist exiles living in China, such as Günter Nobel and Eugenia Nobel.

In August 1947, König and his wife returned to Germany. The same year he joined the Socialist Unity Party of Germany. He served as editor-in-chief of the Sächsische Zeitung in Dresden from late 1947 to March 1950.

Beginning in April 1950, König worked Ministry for Foreign Affairs. In June 1950, he became the first ambassador of the German Democratic Republic to the People's Republic of China. He would remained ambassador to China until 1955, when he was succeeded by Richard Gyptner. During his time as ambassador to China, he was simultaneously appointed as ambassador to North Korea from 1951 to 1954 and Vietnam from 1954 to 1955.

König was ambassador of the German Democratic Republic to the Soviet Union from July 1955 to August 1959. Like his predecessor, Rudolf Appelt, he was simultaneously the ambassador to Mongolia. In 1958, Mongolia was granted a separate ambassador, with Johannes Dick succeeding König. After returning from Moscow in 1959, he became Deputy Minister for Foreign Affairs. In 1963, he was awarded the Patriotic Order of Merit in gold. In April 1965, König became the ambassador to Czechoslovakia. He died in Prague on 22 January 1966.

== Awards ==
- Patriotic Order of Merit, in gold (1963)
- Patriotic Order of Merit, in silver (1954 and 1959)
