= Stefan Heymann =

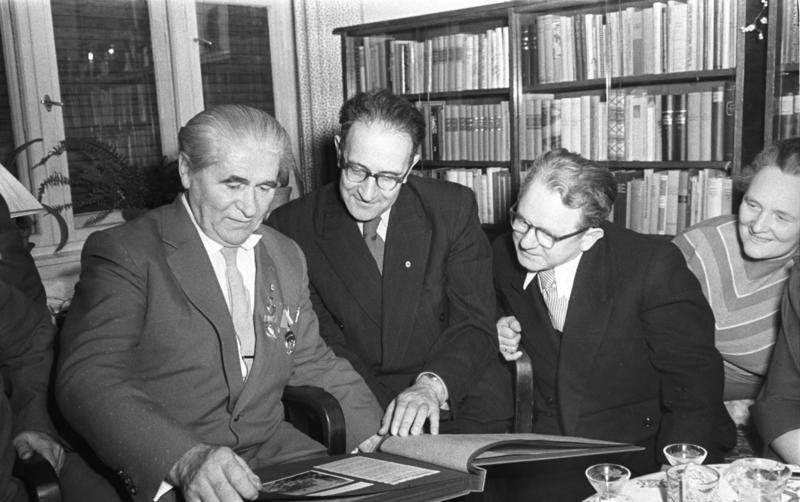
- From left to right: Robert Siewert, Stefan Heymann, Walter Bartel, 1957

East German Ambassador to the Polish People's Republic
- In office 1953–1957
- Preceded by: Aenne Kundermann
- Succeeded by: Josef Hegen

East German Ambassador to the Hungarian People's Republic
- In office 1951–1953
- Preceded by: Erich Kops
- Succeeded by: Sepp Schwab

Head of the Culture and Education Department of the Central Committee
- In office 1949–1950
- Secretary: Fred Oelßner; Hans Lauter
- Preceded by: Fred Oelßner; Richard Weimann
- Succeeded by: Egon Rentzsch

Member of the Landtag of the Republic of Baden
- In office 4 June 1928 – 24 October 1929
- Preceded by: Paul Schreck
- Succeeded by: multi-member district

Personal details
- Born: March 14, 1896 Mannheim, Republic of Baden, German Empire (now Baden-Württemberg, Germany)
- Died: February 3, 1967 (aged 70) East Berlin, East Germany
- Resting place: Zentralfriedhof Friedrichsfelde
- Party: Socialist Unity Party (1946–1967)
- Other political affiliations: Communist Party of Germany (1919–1946)
- Spouse: Erika Heymann
- Awards: Patriotic Order of Merit, 2nd class
- Military Service
- Allegiance: German Empire
- Branch: Imperial German Army
- Conflicts: First World War (WIA)

Stefan Heymann (March 14, 1896 – February 3, 1967) was a German diplomat, politician, and Holocaust survivor.

== Life ==
Heymann was born on March 14, 1896, in Mannheim to a Jewish family. After completing school, he did an apprenticeship as a banker. Heymann volunteered for military service in the First World War and was wounded several times. At the conclusion of the war, he took part in the proclamation of a Soviet in the Palatinate alongside Ernst Toller and Erich Mühsam. Heymann joined the Communist Party of Germany upon its foundation. He was dismissed from his job at a bank in Mannheim due to his communist sympathies. Heymann was an active member of the Rotfrontkämpferbund, and held regional leadership roles in the organization. In 1924 he was sentenced by a court in Leipzig to three and a half years in prison for "preparing for high treason", but was pardoned in 1926. Heymann was active in the charitable organizations Rote Hilfe and Workers International Relief. From 1928 to 1929 he was a member of the Landtag of the Republic of Baden, succeeding Paul Schreck. From 1930 to 1932 he worked as an editor of the Die Rote Fahne in Berlin.

From January 1933, Heymann was editor-in-chief of the newspaper Arbeiterzeitung in Breslau. After the Nazi Party seized power in 1933, Heymann was arrested and later sent to the Kislau concentration camp in 1936. In 1938, he was transferred to the Dachau concentration camp and then in 1940 to the Buchenwald concentration camp. In 1942, he was sent to the Auschwitz-Monowitz concentration camp, where he was a clerk in the infirmary, and in January 1945 he was sent back to Buchenwald.

Stefan Heymann's first marriage was with Erika Heymann (née Geck), the daughter of the Reichstag member and Offenburg publisher Adolf Geck. The marriage produced two children, daughter Sonja Nerlich (née Heyman) and Dr. Dieter Heymann.

After the liberation from Nazi rule, Heymann was a member of the Communist Party regional leadership in Thuringia and founding member of the Association of Persecutees of the Nazi Regime – Federation of Antifascists. From 1950 to 1953 he was the ambassador of the German Democratic Republic to Hungary. In 1953, he became the ambassador to Poland, replacing Aenne Kundermann. He would remain in this role until 1957, when he was succeeded by Josef Hegen. He then became head of the press department in the Ministry for Foreign Affairs and in 1960 professor at the Walter Ulbricht Academy of Political Science and Law. Heymann died on February 3, 1967, in East Berlin.

== Selected works ==
- Heymann, Stefan (1950). Balzac, der grösste kritische Realist der französischen Literatur. Berlin: Volk u. Wissen.
- — (as co-editor) (1949). Konzentrationslager Buchenwald. Weimar: Thüringer Volksverlag.
- — (1949). Wirtschaft, Horatio! Wirtschaft! Weimar: Werden und Wirken Verlag.
- — (1948). Kampf um Wahrheit und Freiheit. Weimar: Thüringer Volksverlag.
- — (1948). Marxismus und Rassenfrage. Berlin: Dietz Verlag
