= Hugo Gräf =

German Communist politician

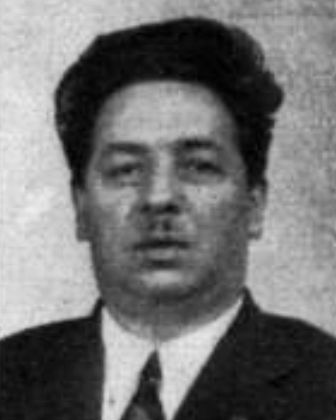
- Gräf circa 1930
- Born: 10 October 1892; Rehestädt, Saxe-Coburg and Gotha, German Empire
- Died: 23 October 1958 (aged 66); Gotha, Bezirk Erfurt, East Germany
- Occupation: Politician
- Political party: SPD (1910); USDP (1917); KPD (1918); SED (1946)
- Spouse: Herta
- Children: Arno Gräf (1932)

Hugo Gräf (10 October 1892 – 23 October 1958) was a German Communist politician.

== Life ==
=== Early years ===
Hugo Gräf was born in a small village some 20 km (12 miles) south of Erfurt in the southern part of what was then central Germany. His father was employed in the building trade: his mother worked in domestic service and agriculture. Gräf worked as a farm labourer from 1902, later undertaking a training as a pipefitter which enabled him to become an itinerant labourer. He became a member of the German Metal Workers' Union in 1907 and joined the Social Democratic Party on 1 May 1910.

=== Military life and politics ===
He was called up for military service in 1912 which would normally have lasted for two years, but the outbreak of war in August 1914 saw him conscripted into the war-time army. In 1916 he was badly wounded and sent home without his left leg. In 1916/17 he was conscripted to work in a gun factory in Erfurt. Here, in 1917, he joined the newly formed Independent Social Democratic Party of Germany (USPD / Unabhängige Sozialdemokratische Partei Deutschlands) which had broken away from the mainstream SPD primarily over the existing party's continued support for the war. He also joined the Spartacus league in 1917 or 1918. In January 1918 he played a leading role in the organisation in Erfurt of the mass strikes which took place in much of Germany that month. Membership of the USPD and the closely associated Spartacus League led naturally to the newly emerging Communist Party (KPD), and on 26 December 1918 Gräf was a co-founder of the Erfurt branch.

In June 1920 Gräf was thrown out of the Communist Party for "anti-parliamentarianism" because he had refused to put his name forward as a candidate for membership of the Reichstag (national legislature) in that year's General Election. It was not the last time he would become embroiled in dispute with his party. He was "rehabilitated" and allowed back into the KPD in 1923. One organisation that retained his services throughout this period was the International League of Victims for Victims of War and of Work (IB / Internationalen Bund der Opfer des Krieges und der Arbeit): he had helped to found the Erfurt branch at the start of 1919. In April 1927 he took over from Karl Tiedt the national presidency of the IB, which he would continue to lead till it was banned by a new government early in 1933. In the 1928 Reichstag election Hugo Gräf stood as a Communist Party candidate and was elected to represent the Dresden-Bautzen electoral district. He continued to sit in the Reichstag, winning his seat again in the election of 5 March 1933, but the Nazi government immediately (and under existing legislation still illegally) cancelled the election results in respect of seats won by the Communist candidates.

=== Arrest, imprisonment and exile ===
Legislation was passed less than three weeks after the March election which had the effect of establishing one-party government in Germany. Parties other than the Nazi party were banned and Communist Party politicians from the Weimar period were at the top of the new government's hit list. On 13 March 1933 Gräf was arrested in Dresden. He was held till 24 June 1935 in "protective custody" in concentration camps, starting with an interrogation camp in Dresden and then, from November 1933 at Colditz where his hearing was permanently damaged and 19 of his teeth were knocked out. He was transferred in May 1934 to Sachsenburg, where he headed up the book-binding workshop. Here in February 1935 he had a frosty exchange with a government visitor called Heinrich Himmler, who had recently taken on responsibility within government for the concentration camps.

In 1935, Gräf studied in Moscow, and subsequently (four months after his release) managed to escape to Czechoslovakia in October 1935. He remained in Czechoslovakia until the annexation of the Sudetenland in 1938, when he moved on to Great Britain, joining up with other exiled members of the German Communist Party. He continued with his political activities, and also headed up locally the Rote Hilfe humanitarian organisation which had been banned back in Germany in 1933. From the British perspective the Second World War broke out in September 1939; one government response involved identifying large numbers of German political exiles as enemy aliens and arresting them. Between July 1940 and October 1941, Gräf was exiled to the Isle of Man, where he was detained until the government was able to reassess their priorities. He later organised an "Emigrants' Club" in Glasgow where he took a job as a toolmaker. In Britain he joined an exiles' organisation called the "Free German Cultural Association" (Freier Deutscher Kulturbund), and later, on 25 September 1943, became a founding member of the British affiliate of the UK-based "Free Germany movement" (Freie Deutsche Bewegung).

=== The German Democratic Republic ===
After the war ended in May 1945 Gräf returned home in August 1946. Home was now in the Soviet occupation zone of what remained of Germany. During the next few years, under Soviet Military Administration, the region would become the Soviet sponsored German Democratic Republic, formally founded in October 1949, but in reality the creation of the new state was an iterative process. Already in April 1946, the merging of the old Communist Party (KPD) and more moderately left wing SPD into the new SED created the basis for a return to one-party government. Hugo Gräf arrived back as a long-standing member of the Communist Party, now no longer illegal in Germany, and like thousands of others, lost no time in signing over his membership to the new Socialist Unity Party of Germany (SED / Sozialistische Einheitspartei Deutschlands). In 1946 he became a spokesman/consultant of the Health Policy Department of the Central Secretariat with the interim administration, having become a department head by 1948. He was one of the founders of the Health Service of the Trade Union Federation (FDGB / Freier Deutscher Gewerkschaftsbund), and on 5 July 1949 he was appointed its first president, serving in this position till 1951.

He joined the executive of the FDGB in 1950. In Thuringia he was a senior regional administrator (Landrat), based in Gotha between 1951 and 1953. However, he resigned on health grounds in May 1953 following a clash with the local party leadership over proposals for a redevelopment of the municipal theatre in Gotha which had been rendered unusable by allied bombing some years earlier. He nevertheless returned to political engagement locally, serving as a member of the Party Regional Leadership in Gotha from 1955 till 1958.
