= Richard Gyptner =

German politician (1901–1972)

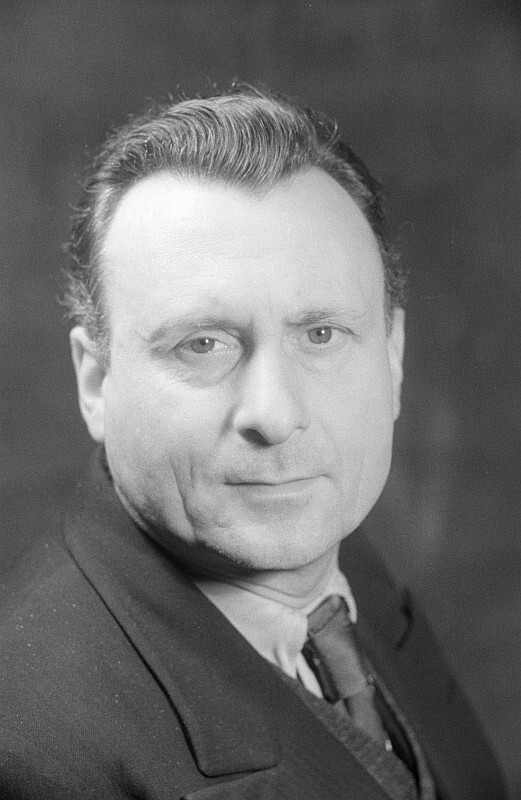
- Gyptner in 1946

East German Ambassador to Poland
- In office March 1961 – April 1963
- Preceded by: Josef Hegen
- Succeeded by: Karl Mewis

East German Plenipotentiary to the Arab League
- In office 1958–1961
- Preceded by: Office established
- Succeeded by: Wolfgang Kiesewetter

East German Ambassador to China
- In office November 1955 – 1958
- Preceded by: Johannes König
- Succeeded by: Paul Wandel

Personal details
- Born: 3 April 1901 Hamburg, German Empire
- Died: 2 December 1972 (aged 71) East Berlin, East Germany
- Party: KPD (1919–1946); SED (1946–1972)
- Children: Rudolf

Richard Gyptner (3 April 1901 – 2 December 1972) was a German communist politician, activist, and later a diplomat in East Germany.

== Biography ==
After graduating from a public school in Hamburg, he gained an apprenticeship in an electrical shop and then joined the Verband Deutscher Handlungsgehilfen ('Association of German Clerks').

In 1919, Gyptner was one of the founding members of the Communist Party of Germany (KPD) in Hamburg. In 1920 he became the first Chairman of the Communist Youth Association of Germany (KJVD). From 1922 to 1928 he was a member of the executive committee of the Young Communist International. In 1929 he became Georgi Dimitrov's secretary in the Comintern. In 1933 Gyptner went to Paris and worked in the office of the International Red Aid of Willi Münzenberg as a representatives of the Comintern. In 1935 Gyptner went to the USSR, where he worked as an editor for the broadcaster Freies Deutschland in Moscow.

Gyptner returned to Germany on 30 April 1945 as a member of the Ulbricht Group, and in June 1945 he became secretary of the KPD Central Committee. After the Socialist Unity Party of Germany (SED) was founded in April 1946, Gyptner became one of the two secretaries of the SED party executive. Between March 1949 and May 1950 he was Vice President of the Berlin People's Police and held a leading position in the Political Information Department.

Gyptner went on to work with the Ministry of Foreign Affairs in February 1953, where he headed various main departments and later became an ambassador. He proposed the establishment of a center for development and reconnaissance, with Rudolf Engel as chairman and Herbert Gute as deputy, and appointed a five-person management committee. Gyptner headed the Kapitalistisches Ausland ('Capitalist Foreign') department in the Foreign Ministry.

Gyptner had been a member and later Honorary President of the League for the United Nations of the GDR since 1954. From November 1955 to 1958 he was ambassador to China, from 1958 to 1961 plenipotentiary of the East German government for the Arab states in Cairo, and from March 1961 to April 1963 ambassador to Poland. In 1964 he retired on a state pension in East Berlin. He died in 1972, and is buried at Zentralfriedhof Friedrichsfelde in Berlin.

== Honors ==
- 1955 – Patriotic Order of Merit (Silver, 2nd class)
- 1957 – Ernst Moritz Arndt Medal
- 1960 – Banner of Labor
- 1961 – Patriotic Order of Merit (Gold, 1st class)
- 1965 – Order of Karl Marx
