= Rudolf Dölling =

Politician in Czechoslovakia and East Germany

Major General Rudolf Dölling

Ambassador of the German Democratic Republic to the Soviet Union
- In office 1959–1965
- President: Wilhelm Pieck; Johannes Dieckmann (Acting); Walter Ulbricht
- Prime Minister: Otto Grotewohl; Willi Stoph
- General Secretary: Walter Ulbricht
- Preceded by: Johannes König
- Succeeded by: Horst Bittner

Chief of the Political Administration
- In office 28 November 1957 – 31 July 1959
- President: Wilhelm Pieck
- Prime Minister: Otto Grotewohl
- General Secretary: Walter Ulbricht
- Preceded by: Gottfried Grünberg
- Succeeded by: Waldemar Verner

Personal details
- Born: 4 November 1902 Roßbach, Kingdom of Bohemia, Austria-Hungary
- Died: 3 August 1975 (aged 72) East Berlin, East Germany
- Party: Socialist Unity Party of Germany (1946–1975)
- Other political affiliations: Communist Party of Czechoslovakia (1923–1946); Communist Party of Germany (1920–1922)
- Spouse: Emmi Effenberger (1906–1990)
- Education: "Voroshilov" Military Academy of the General Staff of the Armed Forces
- Occupation: Soldier, politician, ambassador
- Awards: Banner of Labor; Order of Karl Marx; Patriotic Order of Merit

Military service
- Allegiance: East Germany
- Branch/service: Land Forces of the National People's Army
- Years of service: 1956–1959
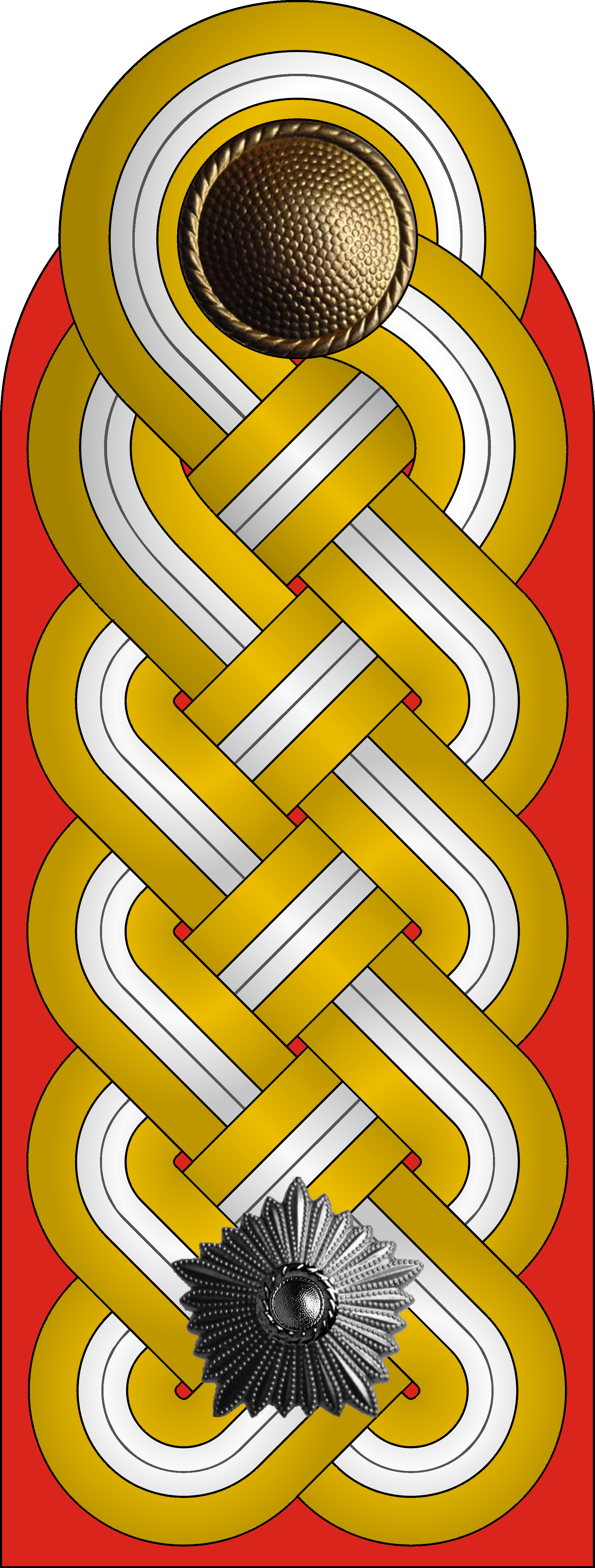
- Rank: Major General

Rudolf Dölling (4 November 1902 – 3 August 1975) was a politician in Czechoslovakia and in East Germany. He later trained for military service and was made a Major-General in the National People's Army of East Germany.

At the end of August 1959 his appointment was announced as his country's ambassador to the Soviet Union.

== Life ==
=== Early years ===
Dölling was born not in Germany, but on the extreme western edge of Bohemia in a little border town called Roßbach (Hranice). Politically it was in the western part of Austria-Hungary. Linguistically the entire region was at the time German-speaking. It was here that he received his schooling, which he completed in 1917, and after which he worked as a general labourer.

=== In Germany ===
In 1918 he moved to Germany where he worked as a farm labourer and a wheelwright. There were also periods working as a miner and periods of unemployment. In 1919 he joined the Communist Youth League. The aftermath of the First World War in Germany was characterized by revolutionary political tensions, confusion and violence, along with acute economic hardship. In 1922 Dölling was expelled from the country on account of his "political activities", and found himself back in what had now become Czechoslovakia, where he would remain till 1938/39.

=== "Back" in Czechoslovakia ===
From 1924 till 1929 Dölling worked as a party functionary in the Czechoslovak Communist Party, then a minority political grouping that seldom achieved much above 10% of the vote in national elections under the young republic's new democratic system. In 1932 he married Emmi Effenberger who was working as a trades union official. Between 1933 and 1939 he worked, based in Prague, as secretary to the Red International of Labour Unions Between 1935 and 1938 or 1939 (sources differ) he sat as a deputy in the Czechoslovak parliament. In 1937/38 he was also responsible for editing the newspaper "Die junge Garde".

=== Soviet Union ===
In 1938 he emigrated with his wife Emmi to Moscow where initially he worked for the International Red Aid organisation. In 1941, from March to December, he was enrolled as a cadet at the School of the Communist International at Pushkino on the north-eastern edge of Moscow. After completing his studies here, Dölling remained at the school, until it was dissolved in 1943, working as a teacher for the group of students from the Czechoslovak/Sudeten German regions. Subsequently, still for the time being in Moscow, he became a member of the expanded leadership team for the Communist Party of Czechoslovakia.

Between 1943 and 1944 he was teaching in the Anti-Faschist classes in Prisoner of war Camp No. 165 in Talitsa, towards the centre of the country, and some 220 km (140 miles) to the east of Yekaterinburg. At the same time he was working as an editor and presenter of the "Sudeten German Freedom radio station" (Sudetendeutschen Freiheitssender) transmitting from Moscow.

=== Back to Czechoslovakia ===
After the war in Europe ended Dölling returned to Czechoslovakia. Between 1945 and 1946 he worked in Prague with the Communist Party Central Committee. Together with Bruno Köhler he was responsible for relocating ethnic-German antifascists out of Czechoslovakia and into the Soviet occupation zone of Germany, as part of the much larger programme of state sponsored ethnic cleansing agreed between the Americans, British and Soviets at Potsdam in July/August 1945. During 1946 Dölling himself relocated across the frontier to what now was in the process of becoming the new East German state.

=== Back in (East) Germany ===
From the start Dölling was active in the party apparatus of the new Socialist Unity Party of Germany. On 15 September he entered the Senior Training and Education Administration (HVA) of the Interior ministry, immediately receiving the rank of "Chief Inspector". Between 1949 and 1952 Rudolf Dölling was deputy chief at the HVA, and in charge of the "political-cultural" department. From 1952 till 1955 he was installed as deputy chief of the "Kasernierte Volkspolizei" (KVP) which in 1956 would be (less confusingly) renamed as the National People's Army. He also held the position of "Director of Political Administration" ("Leiter der politischen Verwaltung "). With the lessening of the post-war taboo against military titles, his rank of "Chief Inspector" had been replaced, in October 1952, with that of "Major General". This meant that Dölling was a member of the first group of East German officers since the end of the war to receive the military title "General".

=== Marching upward ===
From 1955 to 1957 Rudolf Dölling was a student at the prestigious "Voroshilov" Military Academy of the General Staff of the Armed Forces) in Moscow, graduating with a degree in Military Sciences. Returning to Berlin, in 1957 Dölling was appointed Deputy Minister for National Defence and Chief of Political Administration for the National People's Army (NVA). On 1 August Major General Dölling was released from the NVA.

In 1958 he was appointed to the central committee of the SED, retaining his membership of it till 1967. Between 1958 and 1963 he was a deputy in the People's Chamber and a member of its Foreign Affairs Committee.

=== Ambassador ===
Rudolf Dölling's appointment as the German Democratic Republic's ambassador to the Union of Soviet Socialist Republics, was announced in August 1959. He remained in the post till 1965, after which he took on a consultancy role with the East German Foreign Ministry. His successor for the Moscow posting was Horst Bittner.

== Recognition ==
Dölling is one of just a handful of senior members of the East German National People's Army (NVA) to have had an East German regiment named after him.

There is also a "Döllingstraße" ("Dölling Street") in the Leipzig suburb of Paunsdorf.

== Awards and honours ==
- Ernst Moritz Arndt Medal (1957)
- Distinguished Service Medal of the National People's Army
- Banner of Labor (1965)
- Order of Karl Marx (1967)
- Patriotic Order of Merit (bronze, silver, gold and in 1972 "Gold Honour Clasp")
- Combat Order
  for services to the People and Fatherland

Military offices
Preceded by Gottfried Grünberg	Chief of the Political Administration; 28 November 1957–31 July 1959	Succeeded by Waldemar Verner
Diplomatic posts
Preceded by Johannes König	Ambassador of the German Democratic Republic to the Soviet Union; 1959–1965	Succeeded by Horst Bittner
