= Sachsenburg concentration camp =

Nazi concentration camp in eastern Germany

Coordinates: 50°55′56.49″N 13°1′36.78″E

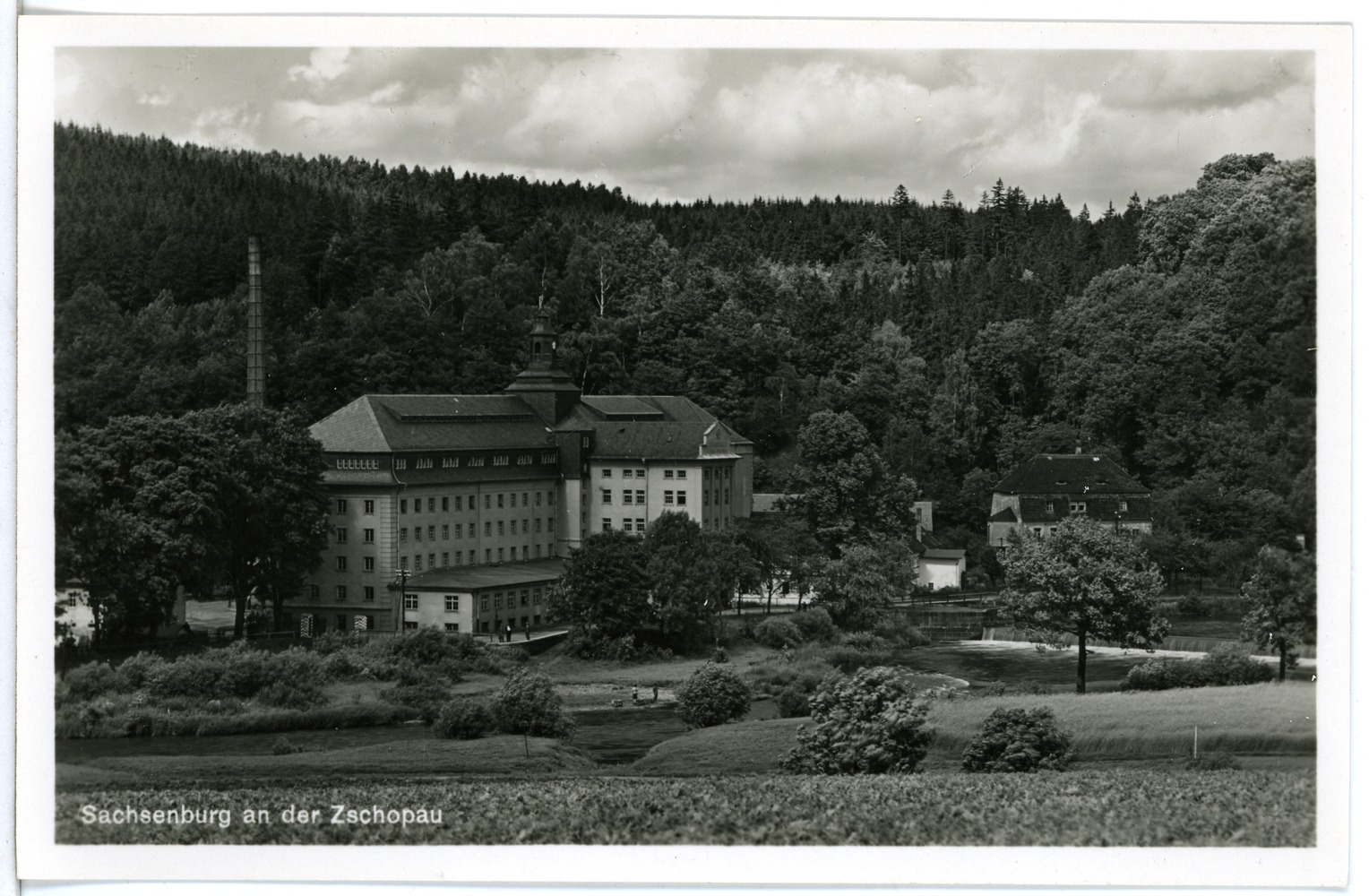
View to KZ Sachsenburg (1933)

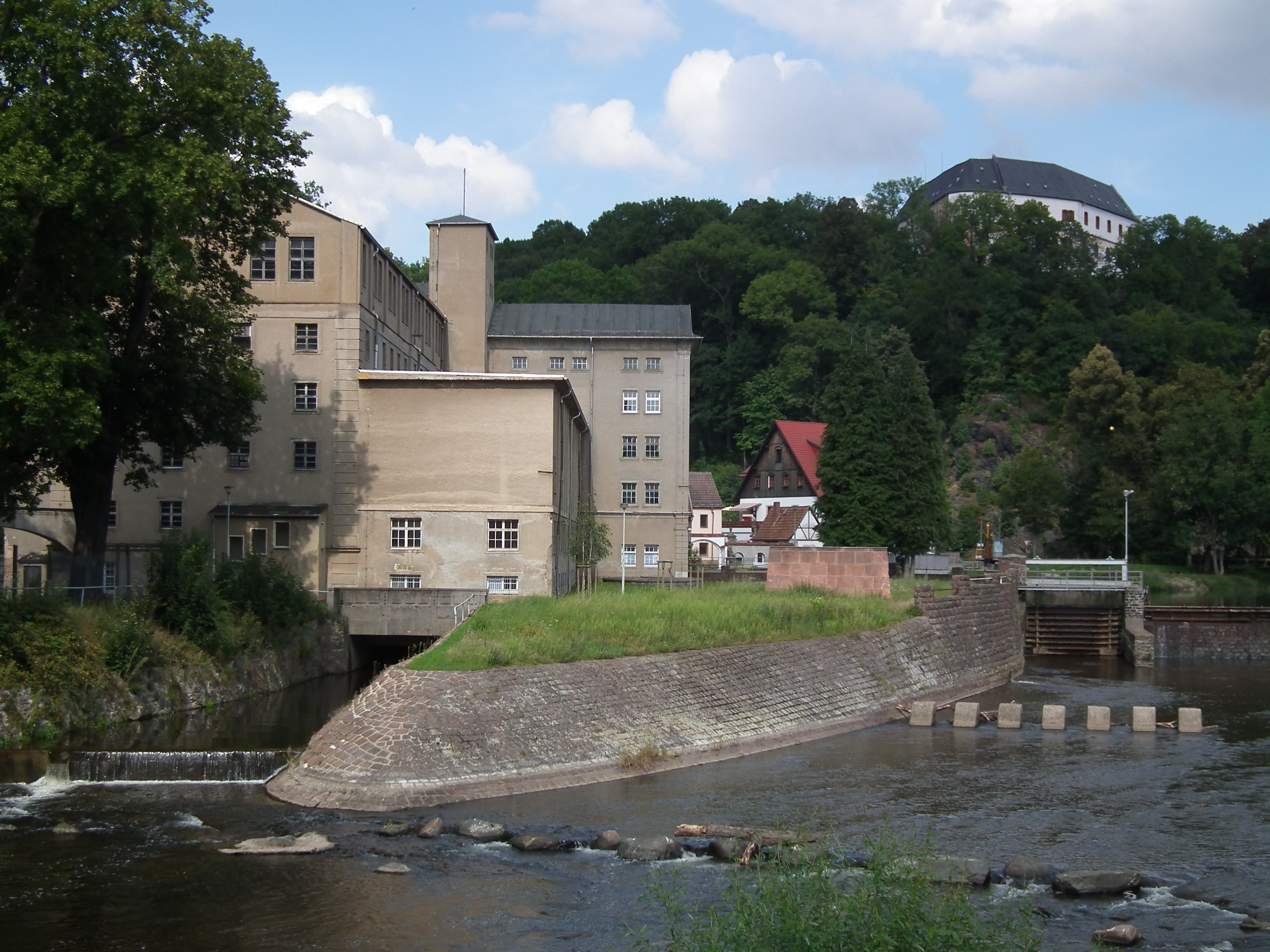
Textile mill under the castle Sachsenburg

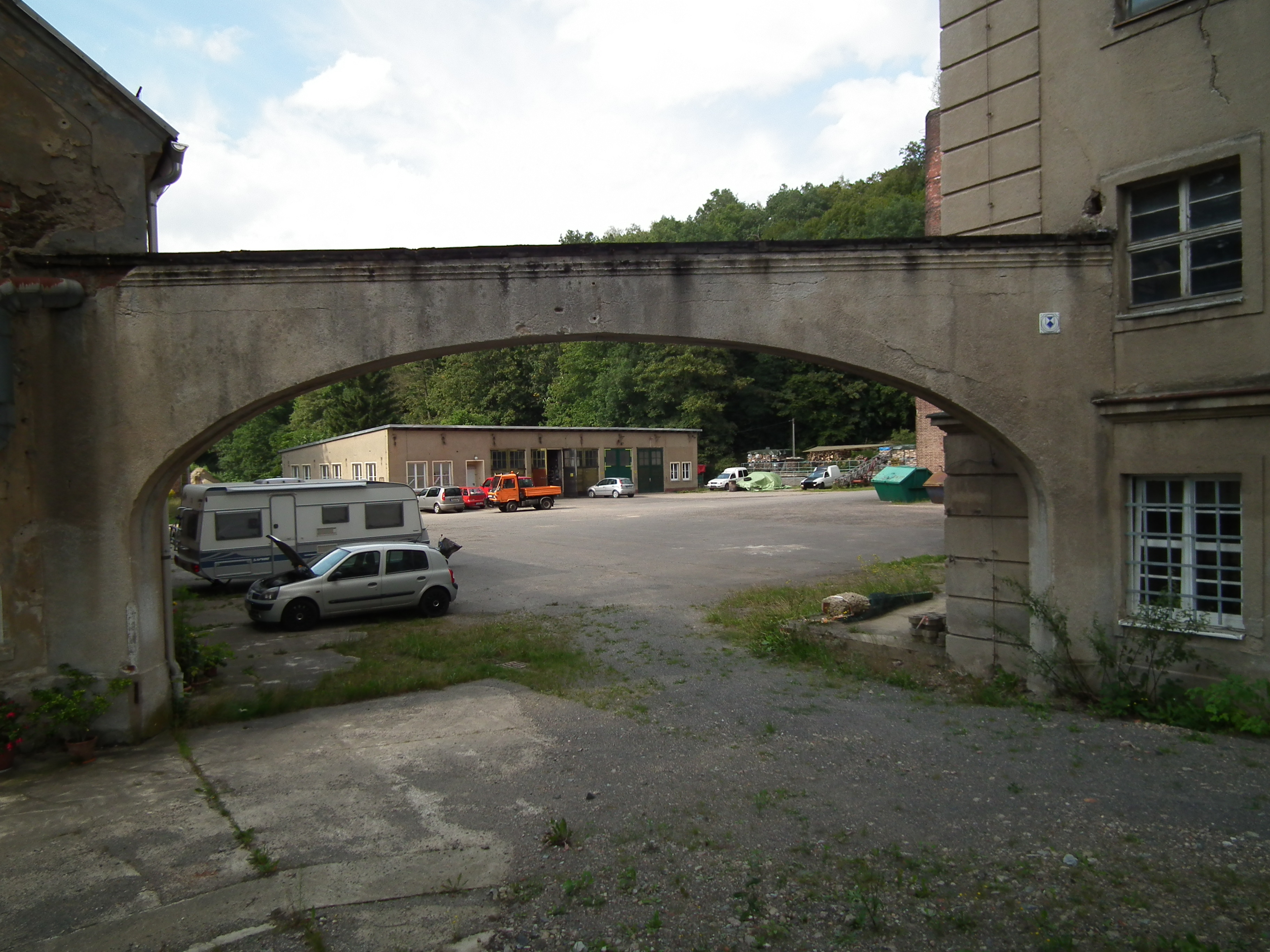
Yard of the factory

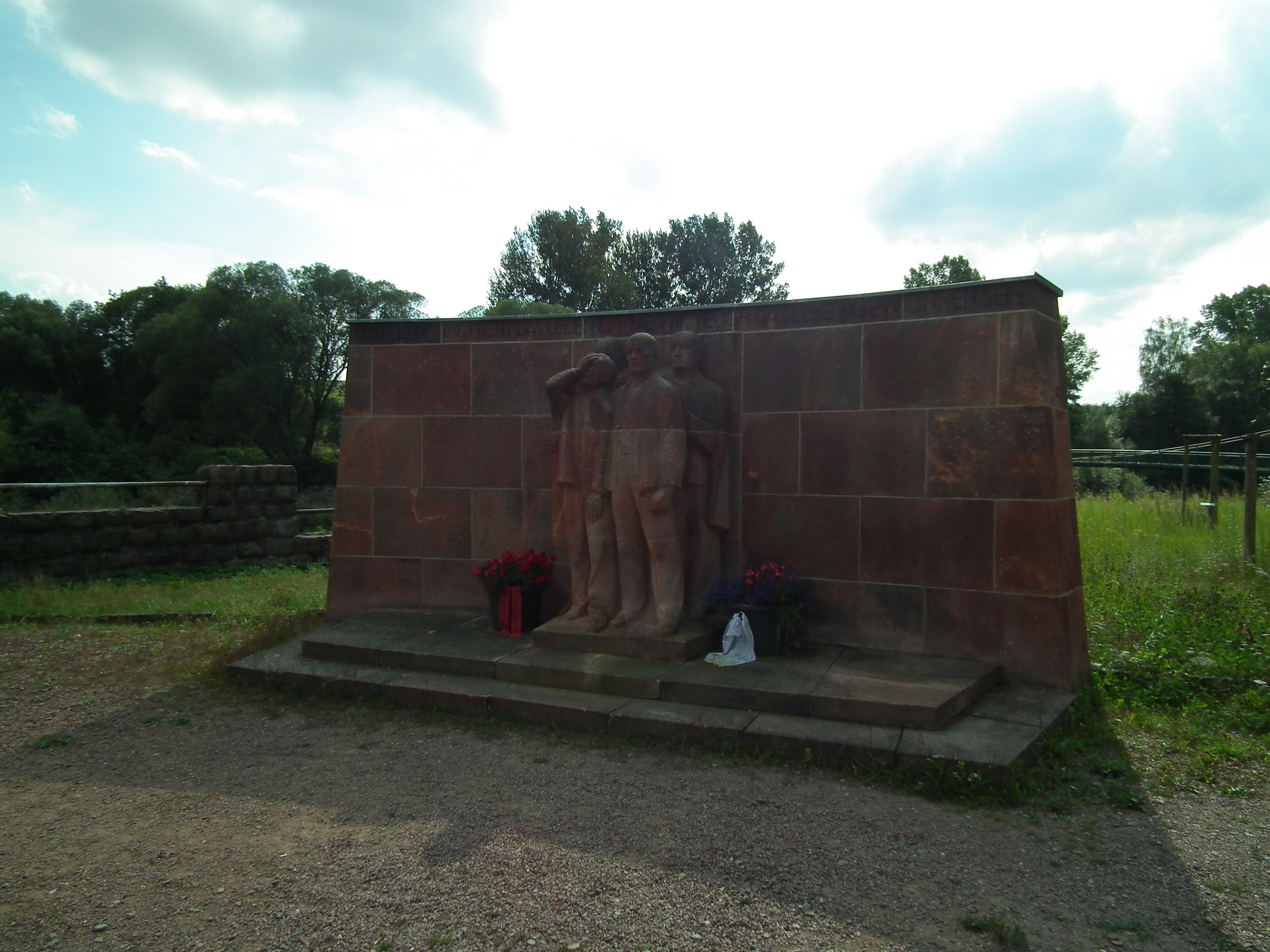
KZ Sachsenburg Memorial

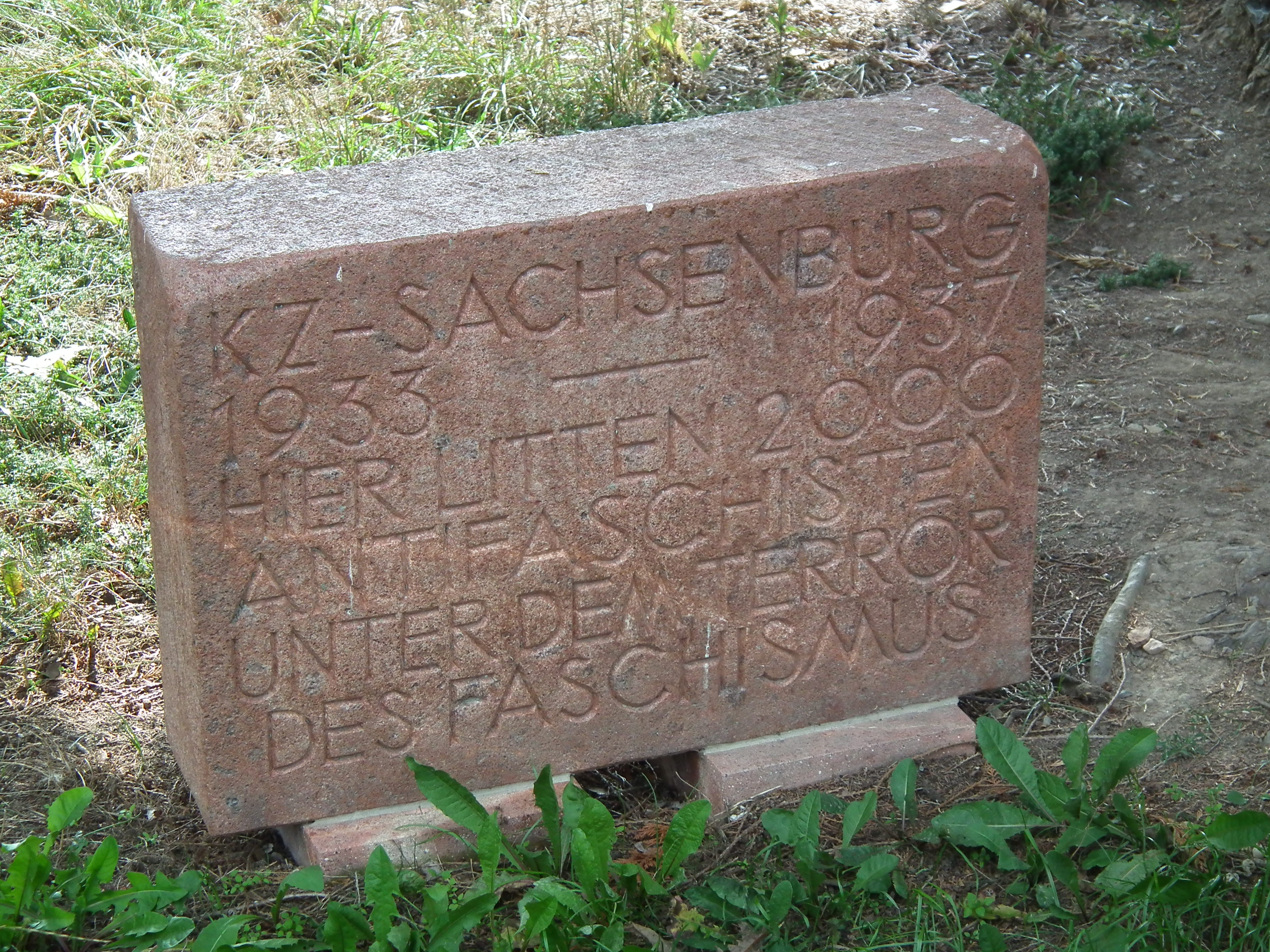
KZ Sachsenburg - Small Memorial Stone

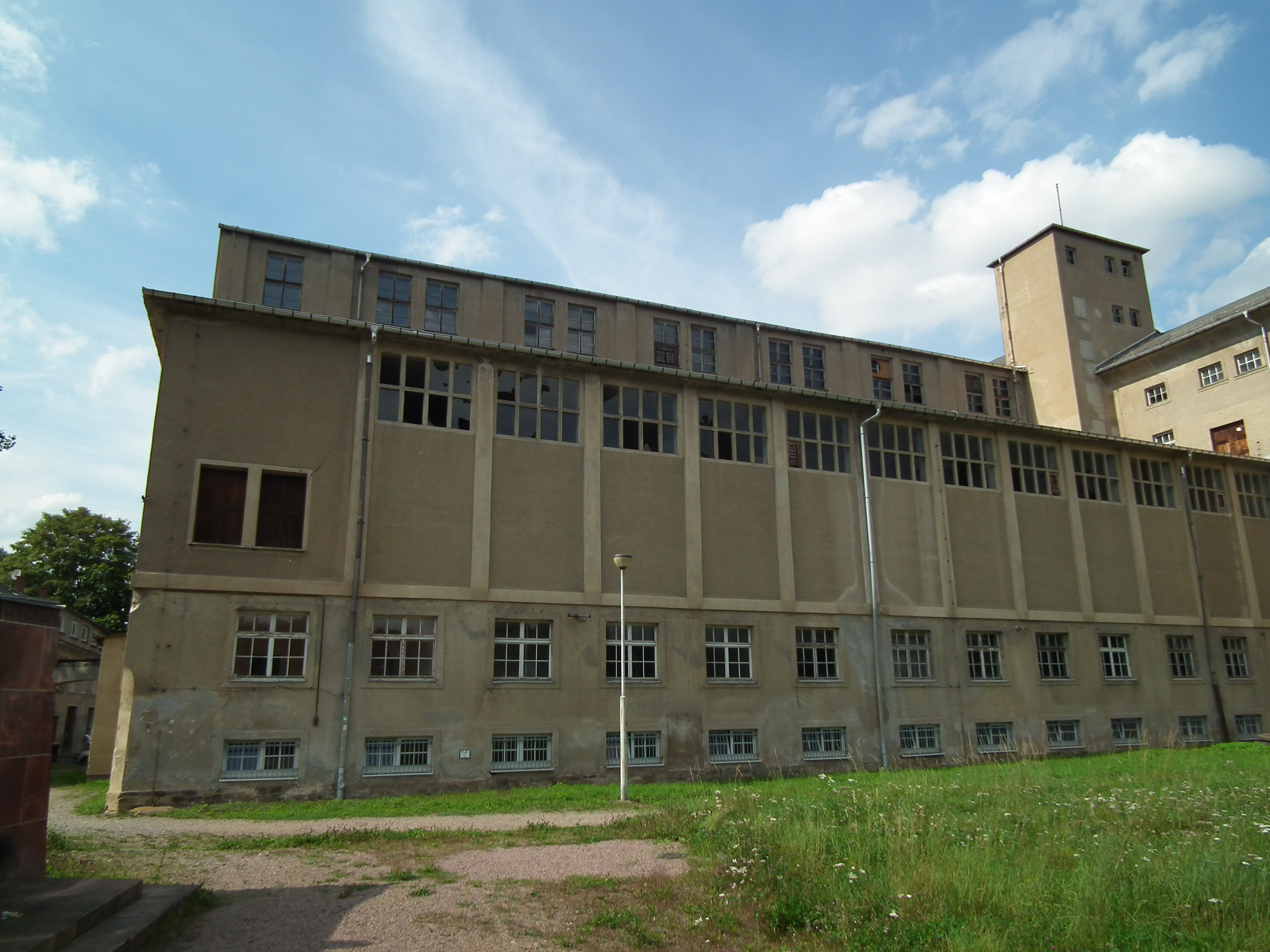
Textile mill

Sachsenburg was a Nazi concentration camp in eastern Germany, located in Frankenberg, Saxony, near Chemnitz. Along with Lichtenburg, it was among the first to be built by the Nazis, and operated by the SS from 1933 to 1937. The camp was an abandoned four-story textile mill which was renovated in May 1933 to serve as a "protective custody" facility for dissidents such as Jehovah's Witnesses, who opposed the Nazi regime.

Sachsenburg was the first concentration camp in which SS used colored triangles sewn onto clothing, as well as armbands, to identify categories of prisoners. Details about the operation of Sachsenburg, held in 17 files (each containing several hundred SS reports) by the International Tracing Service, only became available to researchers in late 2006.

== Interned people ==
- Bruno Apitz
- Hugo Gräf
- Alfred Kästner
- Johannes König
- Erich Mückenberger
- Otto Schön

== See also ==
- Lichtenburg concentration camp
