= Alfred Kästner =

German politician and resistance member

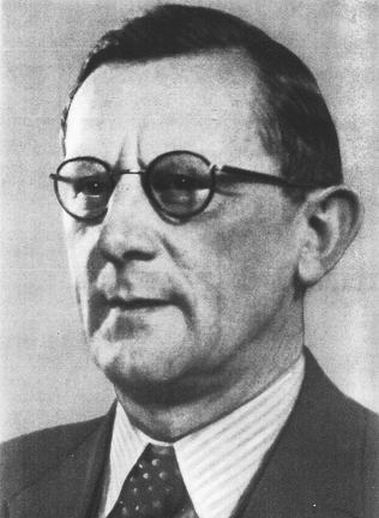
Alfred Kästner

Alfred Kästner (12 December 1882 – 12 April 1945) was a German communist and resistance fighter against Nazism.

== Biography ==
Kästner was born in Leipzig. He was a wood merchant by profession, and a member of the Spartacus League. In November 1918, during the German Revolution, he was elected to the Leipzig Workers' and Soldiers' Council. Kästner was also a founding member of the Leipzig branch of the Communist Party of Germany (KPD) in 1919. When the KPD was banned in 1923–1924, underground meetings were held in Kästner's office.

After the Nazi Party came to power in 1933, Kästner's office was once again used for underground gatherings of KPD activists from Leipzig as well as nearby towns such as Chemnitz, Dresden and Riesa, and for printing illegal pamphlets.

Kästner was arrested in September 1933; although he was sentenced to two years and eight months' imprisonment, he was interned in the concentration camps Sachsenburg, Sachsenhausen and Buchenwald until 1939.

After his release, Kästner joined the resistance group around Georg Schumann and maintained contact with resistance fighters in Hamburg, Bavaria and Württemberg.

Kästner was arrested again by the Gestapo on 11 March 1945. He was shot to death by the SS in Lindenthal, northwest of Leipzig, and thrown in a pit together with 52 other German and foreign anti-fascists on 12 April 1945, just a week before the U.S. Army entered Leipzig.

The street in the Südvorstadt locality of Leipzig where Alfred Kästner lived was renamed Alfred-Kästner-Straße on 1 August 1945.
