= Horst Bittner =

Ambassador of the German Democratic Republic to the Soviet Union
- In office 1965–1974
- Preceded by: Rudolf Dölling
- Succeeded by: Harry Ott

Personal details
- Born: 14 June 1927 Taucha, German Reich
- Died: 16 April 2013 (age 85) Berlin, Germany
- Party: SED
- Occupation: Diplomat
- Awards: Patriotic Order of Merit; Order of Friendship of Peoples

Horst Bittner (14 June 1927 – 16 April 2013) was an East German politician (SED) and diplomat. Between 1965 and 1974 he served as the East German ambassador to the Soviet Union in succession to Rudolf Dölling.

== Life ==
Horst Bittner was born into a working-class family in Taucha, an industrial town on the northeast side of Leipzig. On leaving school he trained and then worked as a printer. He grew up during the Second World War which ended formally in May 1945. By that time the region had been taken over by the American army. However, the division of postwar Germany had already been pre-agreed by the victorious war leaders and in July 1945 the Americans withdrew: the region became part of the Soviet administered occupation zone. Bittner immediately involved himself in the "Anti-fascist Youth" movement in his home region. In 1946 he joined the newly formed Socialist Unity Party ("Sozialistische Einheitspartei Deutschlands" / SED). He enrolled at the Workers' and Farmers' faculty in Leipzig, later switching to the city's university where he studied, and in 1949 obtained his degree, in social sciences.

Between 1949 and 1957 he worked at the Ministry for Foreign and Inter-German Trade after the Soviet occupation zone was relaunched, in October 1949, as the German Democratic Republic. Within the ministry, after a few years he took charge of the "Soviet Union department". In 1954 he was the director leading the East German Industrial Exhibition in Moscow. He entered the diplomatic service in 1957 and served, till 1963, as commercial attaché and deputy head of the East German trade mission in Moscow. Between 1964 and 1965 he held the appointment of Deputy Minister for Foreign and Inter-German Trade.

In 1964 he was appointed East German ambassador in Moscow. It was considered normal in East Germany for the country's most important ambassadorial posts to be held not by long standing career diplomats but by men who had built their careers and contacts inside the country's political establishment. Returning to Berlin, between 1974 and 1984 Bittner held a senior post in the Ministry for Foreign Affairs. His last important posting, between 1984 and 1989, was as Commercial Counsellor at the East German embassy in Prague.

By 1969 Bittner was already being identified in the party newspaper as a candidate for membership of the country's powerful Party Central Committee. Other sources indicate he was a candidate member between 1971 and 1976. Either way, he appears never to have made the final leap to Central Committee membership.

Horst Bittner died aged 85 on 16 April 2013 and was buried in the protestant Georgen-Parochial Cemetery II in Berlin.

== Awards and honours ==
- 1965 Patriotic Order of Merit in bronze
- 1970 Patriotic Order of Merit in silver
- 1974 Order of Friendship of Peoples (Soviet honour)
- 1987 Verdienter Mitarbeiter des Handels der Deutschen Demokratischen Republik (for service to East German trade and commerce)
