= Hory =

- Municipality
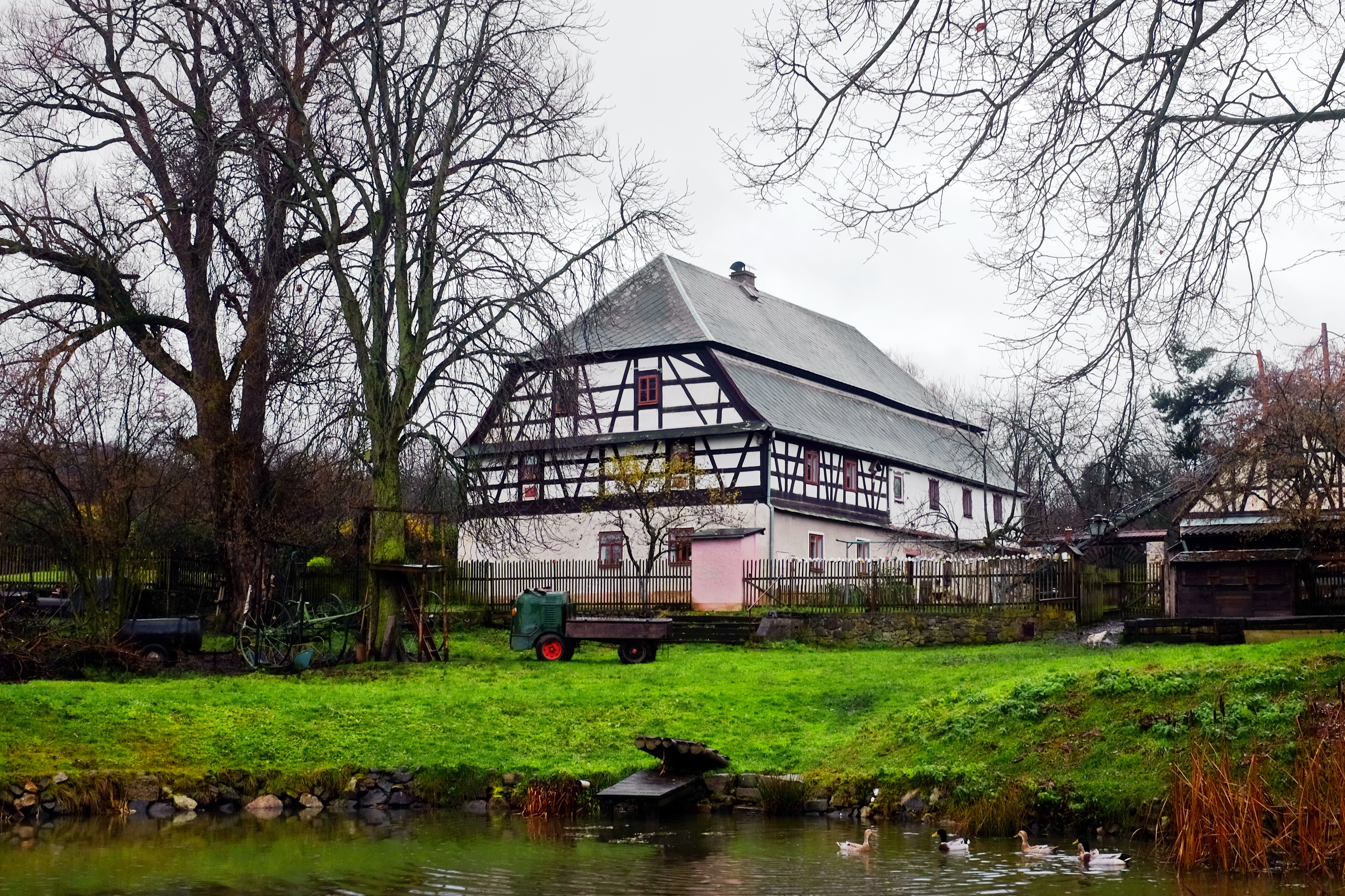
- Half-timbered house

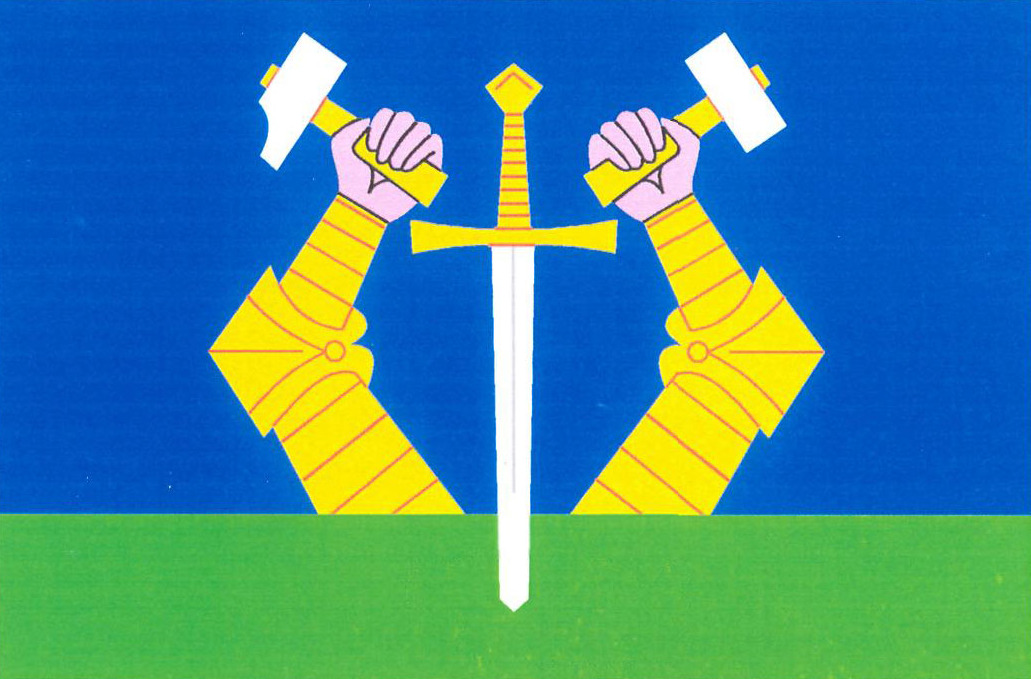
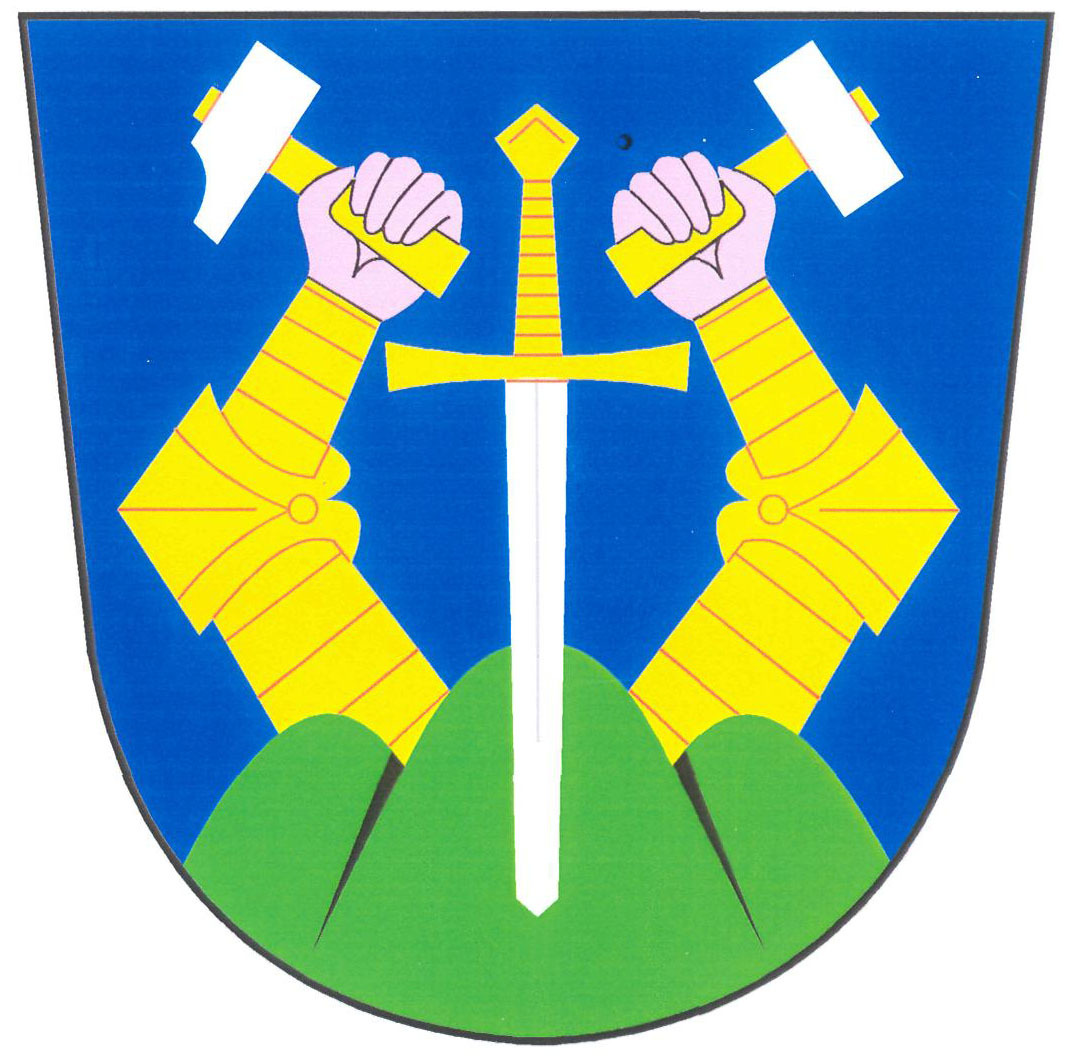
- Flag Coat of arms

- Location in the Czech Republic
- Coordinates: 50°12′50″N 12°47′24″E
- Country: Czech Republic
- Region: Karlovy Vary
- District: Karlovy Vary
- First mentioned: 1350

Area
  - Total: 7.88 km^{2} (3.04 sq mi)
- Elevation: 522 m (1,713 ft)

Population (2026-01-01)
  - Total: 502
  - Density: 63.7/km^{2} (165/sq mi)
- Time zone: UTC+1 (CET)
  - Summer (DST): UTC+2 (CEST)
- Postal code: 360 01
- Website: www.obec-hory.cz

Hory (German: Horn) is a municipality and village in Karlovy Vary District in the Karlovy Vary Region of the Czech Republic. It has about 500 inhabitants.

== Demographics ==
Historical population
Year	Pop.	±%
1869	452	—
1880	452	+0.0%
1890	647	+43.1%
1900	847	+30.9%
1910	919	+8.5%
1921	928	+1.0%
1930	1,028	+10.8%
1950	391	−62.0%
1961	392	+0.3%
1970	321	−18.1%
1980	197	−38.6%
1991	168	−14.7%
2001	185	+10.1%
2011	206	+11.4%
2021	364	+76.7%
Source: Censuses

== Notable people ==
- Josef Hegen (1907–1969), Czech-German politician and diplomat
