= Harry Ott =

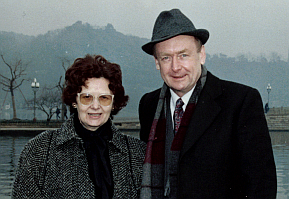
- Harry and Anita Ott (1989)

Permanent Representative of the German Democratic Republic to the United Nations
- In office 1982–1988
- Preceded by: Peter Florin
- Succeeded by: Siegfried Zachmann

Ambassador of the German Democratic Republic to the Soviet Union
- In office 1974–1981
- Preceded by: Horst Bittner
- Succeeded by: Egon Winkelmann

Personal details
- Born: 15 October 1933 Chemnitz, Saxony, Germany
- Died: 24 June 2005 (aged 71) Prieros, Brandenburg, Germany
- Party: SED
- Spouse: Anita
- Children: Tamara; Gerald
- Occupation: Diplomat

Harry Ott (15 October 1933 – 24 June 2005) was a German diplomat who became a politician towards the end of his professional career.

Between 1974 and 1981 he served as the ambassador of the German Democratic Republic to the Soviet Union. In 1982 he was appointed as his country's permanent representative to the United Nations and a Deputy Foreign Minister.

== Life ==
Harry Ott was born into a working-class family in Kappel, an industrial quarter that had been subsumed into Chemnitz back in the nineteenth century. Chemnitz was part of the large industrial belt in the south of what was at the time the central part of Germany. His father, Heinrich Ott, was a weaver. The year of Harry's birth, 1933 had seen the NSDAP (Nazi party) take power in January: by the time of his birth in October progress towards the establishment in Germany of one-party government was well advanced. Ott attended junior school in Kappel till 1948. As a child he was a member of the Hitler Youth organisation in 1944/45 The war ended in May 1945 with the capitulation of Germany and Harry Ott was a founder member of the local anti-fascist youth group in the same year.

At the end of the war Chemnitz had ended up in the Soviet occupation zone of what remained of Germany. In October 1949 the entire area became a standalone Soviet Sponsored state, the German Democratic Republic. By now Ott had moved on, in 1948, to the Secondary school in the High Street of Kappel. He successfully completed his school career in 1952. Although the country had only been established in 1949, the basis for a return to one-party government had already been created in October 1946, under direct Soviet administration, through a controversial merger between the Communist Party and the more moderately left-wing SPD (party). By the time Ott left school there was little sign of former SPD members in the Socialist Unity Party of Germany (SED / Sozialistische Einheitspartei Deutschlands), the controlling positions in which were all occupied by men who before April 1946 would have defined themselves politically as Communists. 1952 was the year of Harry Ott's nineteenth birthday and it was also the year in which he joined the ruling SED (party). It was not till the next year, in May 1953, that Chemnitz was renamed as "Karl-Marx-Stadt". Ott studied Social sciences for a year at Leipzig University (renamed "Karl-Marx-University", Leipzig in 1953). Later in 1953 he was transferred to the Moscow State Institute of International Relations, emerging six years later, in 1959, with a degree in Social Sciences. The Moscow Institute was widely recognized as the specialist institution for training future diplomats, and on returning home Ott started work at the Ministry for Foreign Affairs in East Berlin. Between 1959 and 1966 he worked for the ministry as a consultant, an instructor and, from 1962, as a department head. Between 1963 and 1966 he was responsible for the department for "Socialist Countries".

The constitutional structure of the German Democratic Republic was closely modeled on that of the Soviet Union which placed government institutions, including ministries, in a subservient position to that of The Party. Because the leading role of the party was guaranteed under the constitution, it represented an important promotion when, on 23 February 1966, Harry Ott was appointed Deputy Head of the International Relations Department of the Party Central Committee, a position he retained till 1974. During this time, in June 1971, he was also elected onto the Party's important National Audit Commission.

In March 1974 Harry Ott switched to the diplomatic service when, in succession to Horst Bittner, he was appointed ambassador to the Soviet Union, possibly East Germany's most important diplomatic posting. Ott left his Moscow posting in January 1981. In the meantime he had been elected to an equally important job back home, elected in May 1976 as one of the 145 members of the East German Party Central Committee. He remained a member till the Central Committee resigned at the end of 1989 as part of the sequence of events leading to German reunification the next year.

On 1 February 1982 Harry Ott took on another high-profile diplomatic role as the German Democratic Republic's permanent representative at the United Nations, in succession to Peter Florin. Simultaneously he was given a government post as a Deputy Foreign Minister. His term in the United Nations job came to an end in 1988, but according to some sources he retained the governmental responsibilities for several months in the Modrow government, formally till April 1990.

During the run-up to reunification Harry Ott became a consultant with the Berlin-based Society for the protection of civil rights and human dignity, an association of former GDR dignitaries and members of the Staatssicherheit. He also acted as a consultant for businesses wishing to do business in Russia.

== Awards and honours ==
- 1969: Patriotic Order of Merit in Bronze
- 1970: Lenin Jubilee Medal
- 1973: Patriotic Order of Merit in Silver
- 1979: Banner of Labor
- 1980: Order of Friendship of Peoples
- 1983: Patriotic Order of Merit in Gold
- 1983: Order of Karl Marx
- 1988: Star of People's Friendship in Silver
