= Günter Kohrt =

Ambassador of the German Democratic Republic to Hungary
- In office 1973–1974
- Preceded by: Herbert Plaschke
- Succeeded by: Gerhard Reinert

Ambassador of the German Democratic Republic to China
- In office 1964–1966
- Preceded by: Josef Hegen
- Succeeded by: Martin Bierbach

Personal details
- Born: March 11, 1912 Berlin, German Empire
- Died: December 17, 1982 (aged 70) German Democratic Republic
- Resting place: Zentralfriedhof Friedrichsfelde
- Party: Socialist Unity Party of Germany (1946–); Communist Party of Germany (1945–1946); Social Democratic Party of Germany (1930–1945)
- Awards: Patriotic Order of Merit, honour clasp (1982); Star of Peoples' Friendship (1977); Patriotic Order of Merit, in gold (1972); Banner of Labor (1969); Patriotic Order of Merit, in silver (1962)
- Military Service
- Allegiance: Nazi Germany
- Branch: Wehrmacht
- Conflicts: Second World War

Günter Kohrt (March 11, 1912 – December 17, 1982) was a German politician and diplomat.

== Life ==
Kohrt was born on March 11, 1912, in Berlin, the son of an electrician. After completing elementary and secondary school, he then worked as an accountant in Berlin. In 1929, he joined the German Freethinkers League and in 1930 the Social Democratic Party of Germany (SPD). In 1941, Kohrt was conscripted into military service in the Wehrmacht. During the Second World War he served in a medical unit. At the conclusion of the war, he held by the US Army as prisoner of war in Moosbach.

In 1945 Kohrt joined the Communist Party of Germany, then became a member of the Socialist Unity Party in 1946. From August 1945 to 1949 he held a number of positions relating to the reestablishment of education in Berlin following the war.

From December 1949 to February 1951, Kohrt served as personal advisor to Anton Ackermann in the Ministry for Foreign Affairs. Between 1951 and 1954, he held a succession of leadership roles within the Ministry for Foreign Affairs, having an influence on the development of the diplomatic relations between the German Democratic Republic and Western European countries.

From 1954 to 1957, Kohrt studied in the Soviet Union, graduating with a degree in social sciences.

From 1964 to 1966, Kohrt was the ambassador of the German Democratic Republic to China. He was recalled and replaced by Martin Bierbach on the initiative of Otto Winzer so that he could be appointed deputy minister for Foreign Affairs. Kohrt played a key role in improving relations between East and West Germany during the era of Ostpolitik. He was a member of Willi Stoph's delegation at the talks between West German Chancellor Willy Brandt and Stoph, in Erfurt and Kassel in 1970. Kohrt was appointed as a negotiator for the talks that resulted in the Four Power Agreement on Berlin.

From 1973 to 1974, Kohrt was the ambassador of the German Democratic Republic to Hungary. In 1974, he returned to the Ministry of Foreign Affairs as an advisor; retiring in 1975.

== Awards ==
- Patriotic Order of Merit, honour clasp (1982)
- Star of Peoples' Friendship (1977)
- Patriotic Order of Merit, in gold (1972)
- Banner of Labor (1969)
- Patriotic Order of Merit, in silver (1962)

== Selected works ==
- Kohrt, Günter (1980). Auf stabilem Kurs. Stationen der Außenpolitik der DDR (trans. On a stable course - Stages of the foreign policy of the GDR). Berlin: Dietz Verlag. ISBN
