= Erich Kops =

Ambassador of the German Democratic Republic to Hungary
- In office 1949–1951
- Preceded by: position established
- Succeeded by: Stefan Heymann

Personal details
- Born: January 20, 1905 Jena, German Empire
- Died: May 28, 1961 (aged 56) Dresden, German Democratic Republic
- Party: Socialist Unity Party of Germany (1946–); Communist Party of Germany (1923–1946); Social Democratic Party of Germany (1922–1923)
- Education: International Lenin School
- Awards: Patriotic Order of Merit, in bronze (1959)
- Military Service
- Allegiance: (Spain) Second Spanish Republic
- Branch: Spanish Republican Army
- Service years: 1937–1939
- Units: 35th Division; XII International Brigade; Thälmann Battalion
- Conflicts: Spanish Civil War

Erich Ernst Kops (January 20, 1905 – May 28, 1961) was a German politician, diplomat, and Holocaust survivor.

== Life ==
Erich Kops was born on January 20, 1905, to a working-class family in Jena; his father was a metalworker. In 1922, he joined the Social Democratic Party of Germany (SPD). In Jena, he became chairman of the Sozialistische Arbeiter-Jugend (trans. Socialist Workers' Youth) for Thuringia. In August 1923, he left both the SAJ and SPD; joining the Communist Party of Germany (KPD). Kops then became chairman of the Young Communist League of Germany (KJVD) in Thuringia. Party leadership considered him to be associated with the left communist faction of the party. In October 1924, Kops was arrested; he was sentenced to two years in prison in Leipzig at the end of 1925 for "preparing for high treason" but was released shortly afterwards due to an amnesty. From 1925 to 1928, he worked in the youth section of the Roter Frontkämpferbund. Between 1928 and 1929 he attended the International Lenin School in Moscow, after which he became local editor of the "Neue Zeitung" newspaper in Jena.

After the Nazi Party seized power in 1933, Kops joined the underground resistance against Nazism. Government crackdowns forced him to emigrate to Czechoslovakia in 1934. In Czechoslovakia, Kops assisted with the smuggling of anti-fascist literature into the German Reich. In 1935, he went to the Soviet Union and worked there as a machine fitter. In 1937, he enlisted in the International Brigades, and fought in the Spanish Civil War as an officer in the Thälmann Battalion. Following the conclusion of the Spanish Civil War, he was interned in France, along with many other members of the Thälmann Battalion. In 1943, Vichy French authorities handed Kops over to the Nazi authorities. He was transferred to Sachsenhausen concentration camp, where he would remain until the conclusion of the Second World War.

In 1945, he was appointed as the Landrat of Ludwigslust by the Soviet occupation authorities. When the KPD merged into the Socialist Unity Party of Germany (SED) in 1946, Kops joined the SED. He then held a series of regional leadership roles in Thuringia for the SED. In 1949, Kops was appointed as the first ambassador of the German Democratic Republic to Hungary. He held this role until 1951, when he was replaced by Stefan Heymann. In 1959, he was awarded the Patriotic Order of Merit in bronze. Kops died on May 28, 1961, in Dresden.
