= Hranice (Cheb District) =

- Town
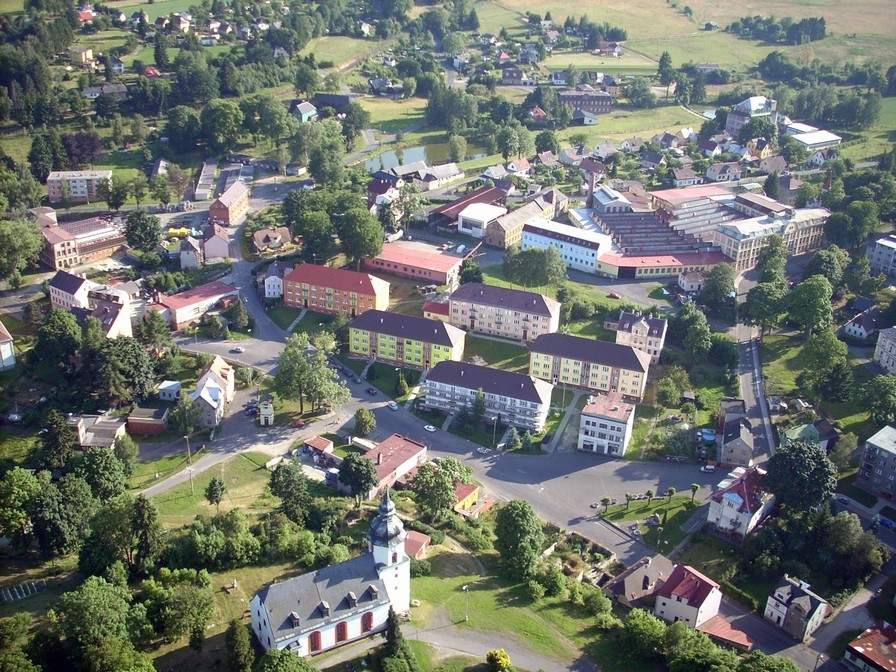
- Aerial view of Hranice

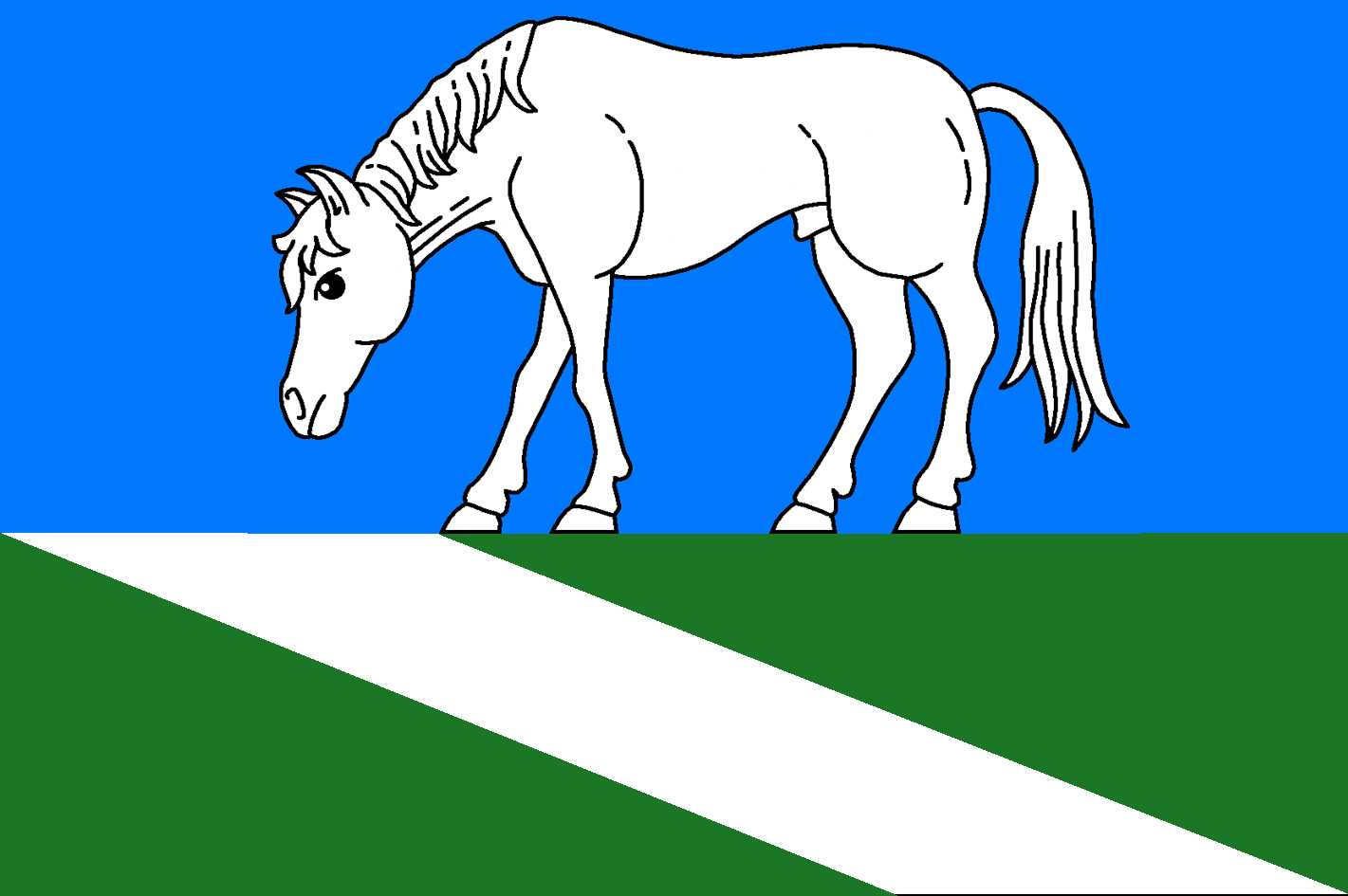
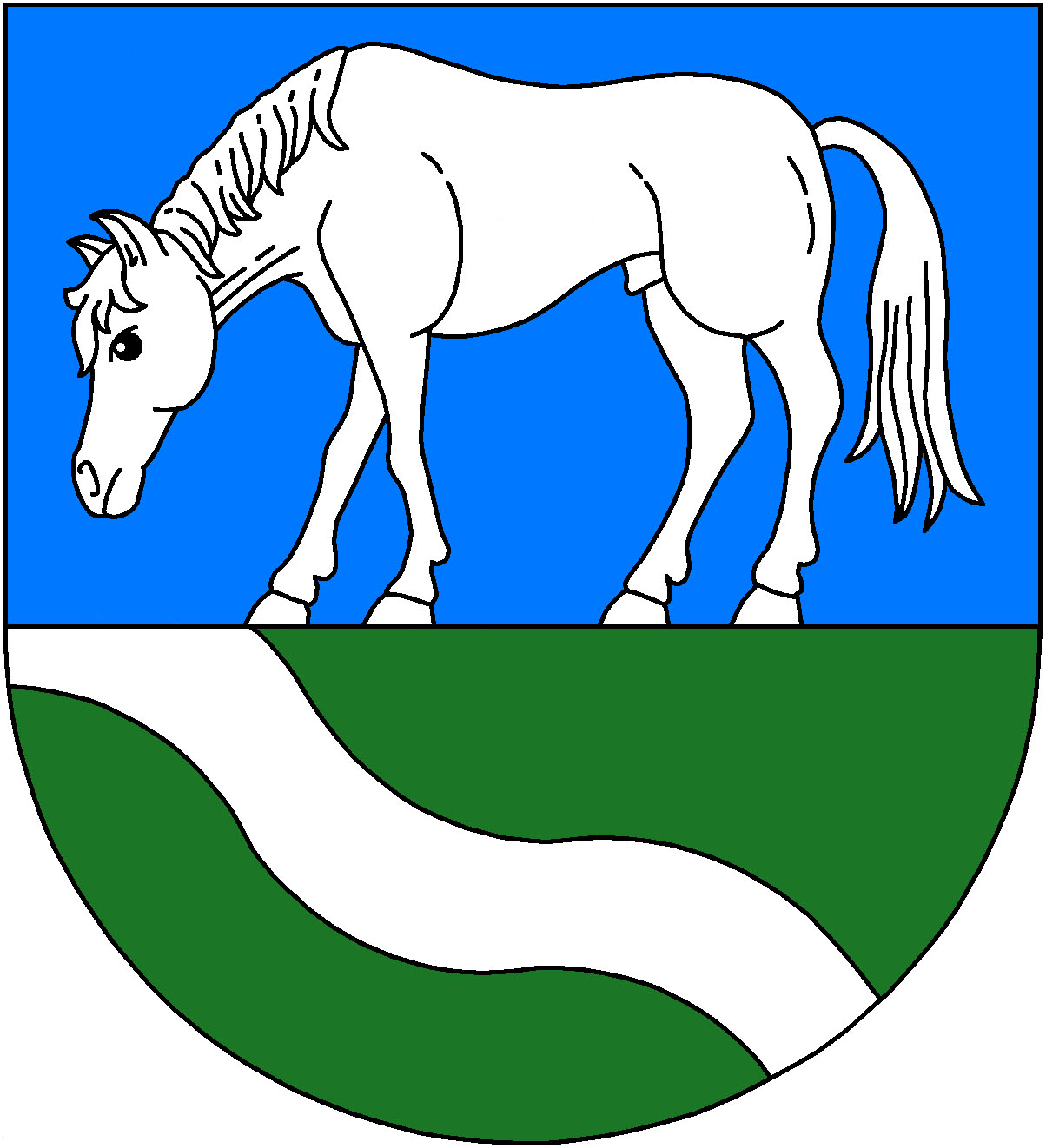
- Flag Coat of arms

- Location in the Czech Republic
- Coordinates: 50°18′17″N 12°10′33″E
- Country: Czech Republic
- Region: Karlovy Vary
- District: Cheb
- First mentioned: 1413

Government
  - Mayor: Daniel Mašlár

Area
  - Total: 31.79 km^{2} (12.27 sq mi)
- Elevation: 575 m (1,886 ft)

Population (2026-01-01)
  - Total: 2,070
  - Density: 65.1/km^{2} (169/sq mi)
- Time zone: UTC+1 (CET)
  - Summer (DST): UTC+2 (CEST)
- Postal code: 351 24
- Website: www.mestohranice.cz

Hranice (Czech pronunciation: [ˈɦraɲɪtsɛ]; German: Roßbach) is a town in Cheb District in the Karlovy Vary Region of the Czech Republic. It has about 2,100 inhabitants. The town is located in the Fichtel Mountains on the border with Germany and is the westermost town of the Czech Republic.

Hranice was probably founded at the turn of the 12th and 13th centuries. For almost 500 years, it was owned by the noble Zedtwitz family.

== Administrative division ==
Hranice consists of four municipal parts (in brackets population according to the 2021 census):

- Hranice (1,643)
- Pastviny (73)
- Studánka (258)
- Trojmezí (24)

== Etymology ==
The old German name Rossbach means 'horse brook', referring to the brook where first inhabitants watered their horses. Therefore the horse appears on the town's coat of arms and flag.

In Czech, hranice means 'border'. Following the partition of Germany, a border tripoint (between Czechoslovakia, West Germany and East Germany) was situated near the town, for which the village of Trojmezí (lit. 'tripoint') is named. The village is also the tripoint of the historical regions of Bohemia, Bavaria and Saxony.

== Geography ==
Hranice is located about 28 kilometres (17 mi) northwest of Cheb and 49 km (30 mi) west of Karlovy Vary. It lies in the Aš Panhandle region, in the westernmost part of the region, on the border with Germany. It neighbors the German municipalities of Bad Elster to the southeast, Adorf to the northeast, Eichigt to the north, Regnitzlosau to the west, and Rehau to the southwest.

Hranice is situated in the Fichtel Mountains. The highest point is the hill Studánecký vrch at 697 m (2,287 ft) above sea level. The municipal territory is rich in minor watercourses. The stream Hranický potok/Tetterweinbach originates in the town and flows through Hranice. The streams Bystřina and Rokytnice form here a significant part of the Czech–German border.

== History ==
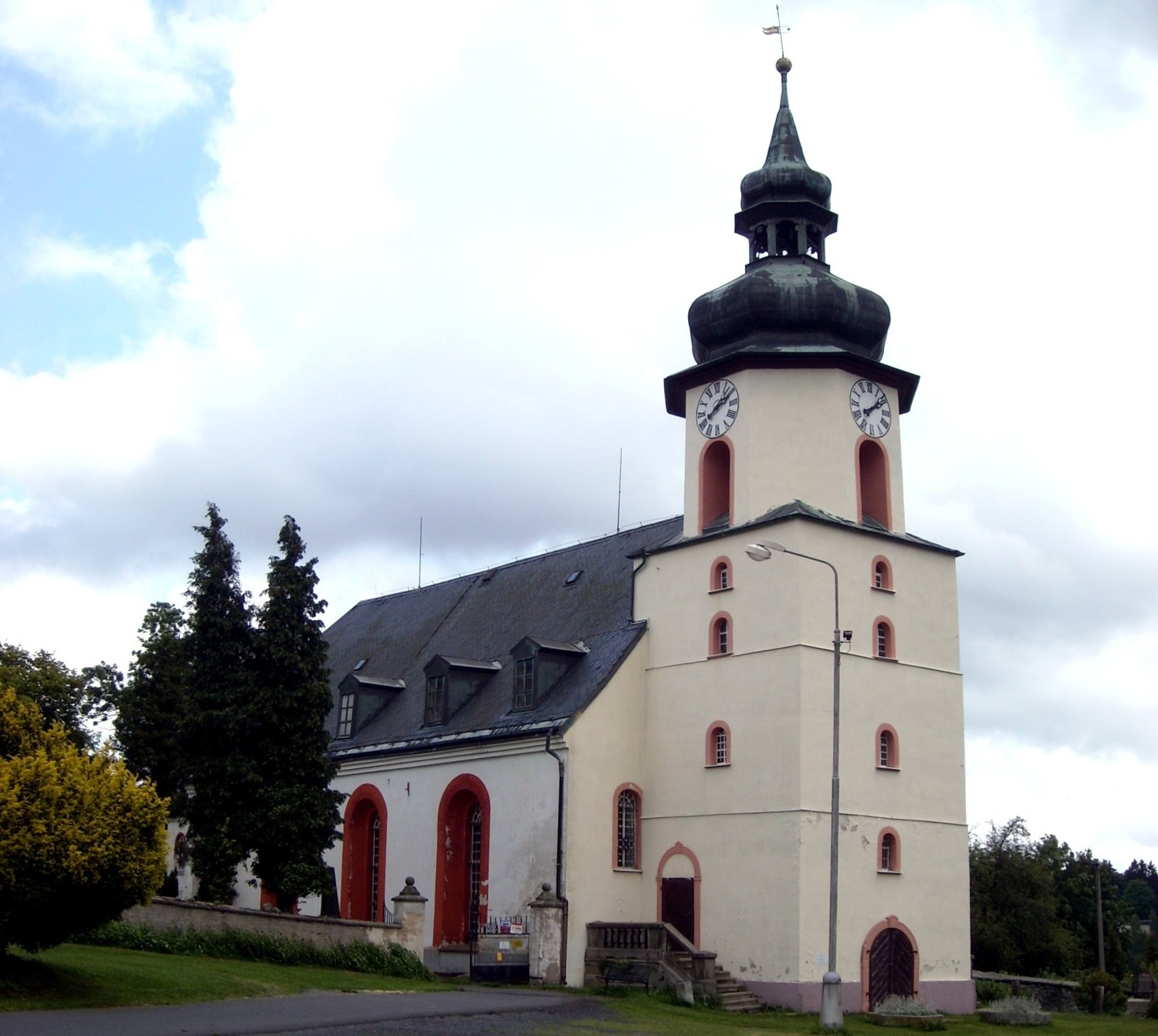
Evangelical church

The settlement was probably founded at the turn of the 12th and 13th centuries. The first unverified mentions of Hranice come from the beginning of the 14th century. The first verified written mention of Hranice dates to 1413, when it was bought by the Zedtwitz family. Before that time, Hranice was the property of the Counts of Neipperg. At the end of the 14th century, the Neippergs ran into financial trouble and sold the town. The Zedwitz family owned the entire Aš estate for 600 years, so they ruled Hranice for almost 500 years.

In 1822 a new school was built. In 1850, a post office was opened and in 1868, the first fire squad was established. In 1882, Hranice was promoted to a market town.

In the 1930s, a group of Sudeten German settlers from Hranice immigrated to Chile and founded the settlement of Puyuhuapi, where they lived and intermarried with Mapuches from Chiloé Archipelago.

== Demographics ==
Historical population

| Year | Pop. | ±% |
|---|---|---|
| 1869 | 5,982 | — |
| 1880 | 6,296 | +5.2% |
| 1890 | 6,047 | −4.0% |
| 1900 | 6,568 | +8.6% |
| 1910 | 7,281 | +10.9% |

| Year | Pop. | ±% |
|---|---|---|
| 1921 | 6,357 | −12.7% |
| 1930 | 6,922 | +8.9% |
| 1950 | 3,160 | −54.3% |
| 1961 | 2,417 | −23.5% |
| 1970 | 2,496 | +3.3% |

| Year | Pop. | ±% |
|---|---|---|
| 1980 | 2,428 | −2.7% |
| 1991 | 2,280 | −6.1% |
| 2001 | 2,266 | −0.6% |
| 2011 | 2,096 | −7.5% |
| 2021 | 1,998 | −4.7% |

Source: Censuses

== Transport ==
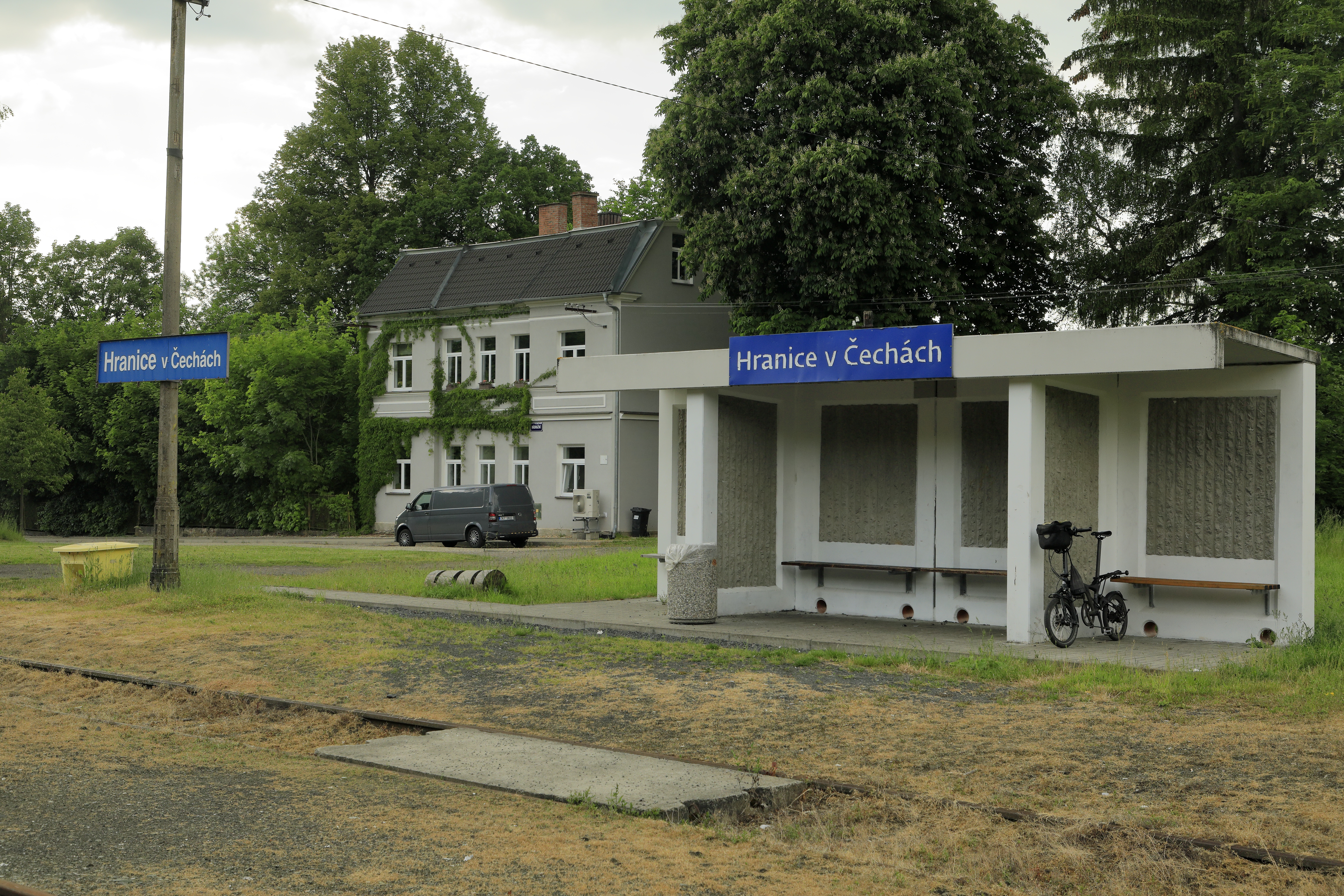
Train station

On the Czech–German border are two road border crossings: Hranice / Ebmath and Hranice / Bad Elster.

Hranice is the terminus and start of a railway line from/to Aš.

== Sights ==
Notable buildings in Hranice include the Evangelic church, built in the 17th century, and the Catholic Church of the Visitation of the Virgin Mary, built in 1894.

There are several memorials: a World War I memorial built in 1928, a World War II memorial, and a memorial to Royal Air Force pilots who crashed in the area during World War II.

== Notable people ==
- Rudolf Dölling (1902–1975), German politician and major general
