= Emmi Dölling =

German editor-in-chief (1906–1990)

Personal details
- Born: Emmi Effenberger; 25 February 1906 Ruppersdorf, Bohemia, Austria-Hungary
- Died: 25 January 1990 (aged 83)
- Party: KSČ; KPD; SED
- Spouse: Rudolf Dölling (1902–1975)
- Occupation: Political activist and senior party official journalist

Emmi Dölling (born Emmi Effenberger; 5 February 1906 – 25 January 1990) was a Czechoslovak/German political activist (KPD/SED) and journalist.

== Life ==
=== Early years ===
Emmi Effenberger was born in Ruppersdorf, one of a cluster of villages subsumed into Reichenberg (as it was then known) in north Bohemia, at that time an ethnically and linguistically German region in the Austro-Hungarian Empire. Her father, like many in the area, was a textile worker. He later became a founder member of the Czechoslovak Communist Party ("Komunistická strana Československa" / KSČ), which some suggest must later have been helpful to his daughter in her own political career. After successfully concluding her schooling she moved on to a Teacher Training College and then embarked on a teaching career in nearby Neustadt.

Following frontier changes mandated at the Congress of Versailles the Austro-Hungarian Empire ceased to exist and Bohemia found itself part of the newly formed state of Czechoslovakia, although at this stage the area of North Bohemia where Effenberger liver remained ethnically and linguistically German. Effenberger joined the Young Communists in 1920 and in 1924, the year of her eighteenth birthday, the KSČ itself, working in her spare time as party secretary for the local party in Kratzau, and later undertaking similar work with the party regional leadership team (Bezirksleitung) in Reichenberg. In 1925 Emmi Effenberger became a member of the teachers' union, the ZdA (later the AfA-Bund). In 1928 she took a job with the Central Committee of the Czechoslovak Communist Youth League ("Kommunistischen Jugendverbandes der Tschechoslowakei"). She took a leading role in building up the Young Pioneer organisation (for children) within the Communist Youth League. In 1928 she embarked on a course at the International Lenin School in Moscow. She returned to Czechoslovakia in 1931 and resumed party secretarial duties.

In 1932 Emmi Effenberger married Rudolf Dölling.

=== Hitler-Stalin years ===
The Nazi take-over across the border in Germany at the start of 1933 had its knock-on effect in the German-speaking parts of Czechoslovakia, and Emmi Dölling was briefly arrested. In 1934 she became secretary to the national executive of the Textile Workers' Union.

During 1938 and 1939 Czechoslovakia was invaded and incorporated into an enlarged German state. During the middle part of the decade, with one-party rule brutally enforced in Germany, Czechoslovakia had become a favourite destination for exiled German communists, but non-Nazi political activists were now no safer in (former) Czechoslovakia than they would have been in post 1933 Germany. In 1938 or 1939 Rudolf and Emmi Dölling emigrated to the Soviet Union.

In Moscow, like her husband, she initially took a job with International Red Aid (MOPR / "Международная организация помощи борцам революции" / МОПР), a Soviet sponsored communist welfare organisation, and with the Comintern, working at the Comintern Academy. In October 1941 she was redeployed to Bashkortostan. In the Soviet Union she was for a time editor at the "Sudetan Germans Freedom Radio" (""Sudetendeutschen Freiheitssender"). Between September 1943 and August 1944 she worked for the "Supress" press agency, and between August 1944 and November 1945 she worked in Moscow for the "Press Service Institute Number 205", one of several organisations that had emerged from the ashes of Comintern after it was officially dissolved by Josef Stalin in 1943.

=== Soviet occupation zone / German Democratic Republic ===
In December 1945, seven months after the formal end of the Second World War, Emmi Dölling returned from Moscow to Prague, joining her husband who had made the same journey seven months earlier.

She relocated again in January 1946, moving to what had been administered, since the previous summer, as the Soviet occupation zone in Germany. She settled in Berlin and transferred into the Communist Party of Germany, taking a job with the party Central Committee. Following the contentious creation in the Soviet zone of the Socialist Unity Party ("Sozialistische Einheitspartei Deutschlands" / SED), launched in April 1946, she was one of thousands of Communist Party members who lost no time in signing their party membership across to the SED.

As a party employee Emmi Dölling held the rank of a department head ("Abteilungsleiterin") of the SED party executive. She became editor in chief of the party newspaper Einheit ("Unity") and in 1946/47 of "Neuer Weg" ("New Way"). Between 1947 and 1949 she was for most purposes out of action, seriously ill with Tuberculosis. Much of this time was spent in a sanatorium in Sülzhayn.

From 1953 she was employed in the party's press office, and later in the Agitprop department of the Party Central Committee. Reflecting her husband's military connections she also worked on a free-lance basis for the Ministry of Defence.

In 1959 her husband, who had himself been appointed a member of the Party Central Committee the previous year, retired from the People's Army and took up an appointment as the East German ambassador to the Soviet Union. The two of them moved to Moscow where they remained until 1965 when Rudolf Dölling retired from his ambassadorial post. When they returned Emmi became a member of the national executive of the Democratic Women's League ("Demokratischer Frauenbund Deutschlands" / DFD).

== Awards and honours (not a complete list) ==
- 1962 Badge of Honour for German-Soviet friendship
- 1978 Medal for Outstanding Performance serving Socialist Education in the "Ernst Thälmann" Pioneer Organisation in Gold
- 1981 Patriotic Order of Merit in Gold
- 1986 Patriotic Order of Merit Gold clasp
