= John Vinycomb =

John Vinycomb (July 4, 1833 - January 27, 1928) was an English engraver, illuminator, and heraldic designer. He worked for Marcus Ward & Co. and he authored several books, some about the city of Belfast, where he was the president of the Belfast Art Society in 1890–1892. His son, John Knox Vinycomb, was an Irish architect.
