= Willy Sägebrecht =

Oberst Willy Sägebrecht
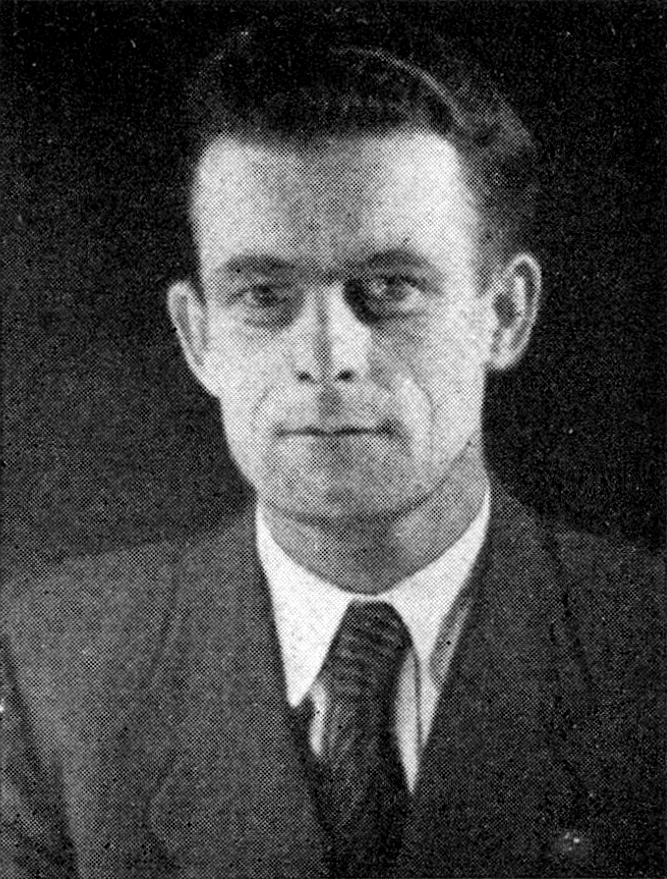
- Sägebrecht c. 1947

Director of Military Intelligence
- In office 1 September 1957 – 31 August 1959
- Deputy: Siegfried Dombrowski
- Preceded by: Karl Linke
- Succeeded by: Arthur Franke

First Secretary of the Socialist Unity Party in Brandenburg
- In office 21 April 1946 – 23 July 1952
- Serving with: Friedrich Ebert Jr. (1946–1948); Paul Bismark (1948–1952)
- Preceded by: Position established
- Succeeded by: Kurt Seibt (Bezirk Potsdam); Gerhard Grüneberg (Bezirk Frankfurt); Franz Bruk (Bezirk Cottbus)
Parliamentary constituencies
Member of the Volkskammer
In office 18 March 1948 – 8 December 1958
Preceded by	Constituency established
Succeeded by	Multi-member district
Member of the Landtag of Prussia for Berlin
In office 25 May 1932 – 31 March 1933
Preceded by	Multi-member district
Succeeded by	Constituency abolished

Personal details
- Born: 21 February 1904 Groß Schönebeck, Province of Brandenburg, Kingdom of Prussia, German Empire (now Schorfheide-Groß Schönebeck, Brandenburg, Germany)
- Died: 8 April 1981 (aged 77) East Berlin, East Germany
- Party: KPD (1925–1946); SED (1946–1981)
- Spouse: Hedwig (1904–1974)
- Children: Ursula (1924–2007)
- Occupation: Politician; Party Functionary; Worker
- Awards: Patriotic Order of Merit, 1st class; Order of Karl Marx
- Central institution membership: 1946–1963: Full member, Central Committee (Note: Party Executive Committee until 1950); 1946: Full member, KPD Central Committee; Other offices held: 1952–1954: First Deputy Chairman, State Planning Commission; 1946–1950: Member, Landtag of Brandenburg; 1929–1931: Political Leader, Northern Berlin-Brandenberg KPD; 1928–1932: Member, Liebenwalde City Council

Willy Sägebrecht (21 February 1904 – 8 April 1981) was a political activist and politician from the Communist Party of Germany who was incarcerated as a resistance activist during the Nazi period. After 1945 he became a member of East Germany's powerful Party Central Committee and then, in 1957, head of the country's Military Intelligence Service.

== Life ==
=== Provenance and early years ===
Willy Sägebrecht was born in Groß Schönebeck (Barnim), a short distance to the north of Berlin. His father is described variously as a farmworker, a factory worker and a brick maker. After leaving school in 1918 Sägebrecht worked in the agricultural and manufacturing sectors in Groß Schönebeck and Liebenwalde. In 1920 he joined the Free German wood workers' union and the Young Socialists. In 1923 he switched to the Young Communists and in 1925, having reached his twenty-first birthday six months earlier, he joined the Communist Party itself. Within the party he was initially drawn to the extremist Weddinger Opposition faction, but after a couple of years he turned back to the Communist mainstream of the time, becoming a member of the party's local leadership team ("Bezirksleitung") for Berlin-Brandenberg in 1927.

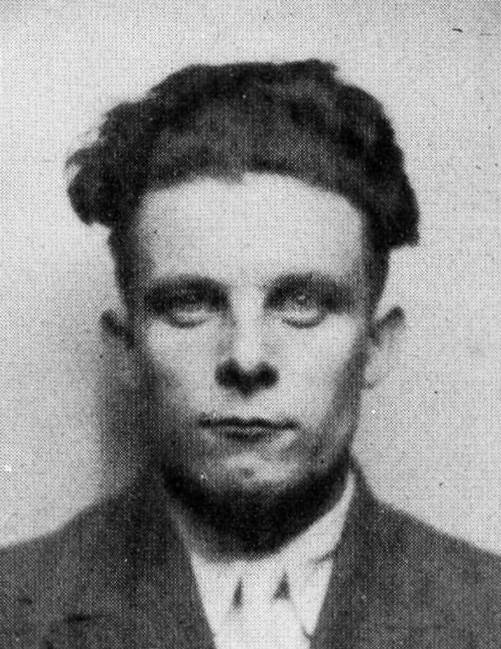
Sägebrecht's official Landtag portrait, 1932

In November 1929 Sägebrecht was elected a local councillor for Liebenwalde and a district councillor for Lower Barnim. During 1929/30 he worked as an instructor in Berlin-Brandenburg with the party's "Military Policy" department ("Abteilung Militärpolitik"), the cover name used for the Antimilitärischer Apparat, which was in effect the party's intelligence service. During 1930/31 he visited Moscow where he attended a course for party officials at the "Military Academy" of the Communist International (Comintern). On his return he became a party instructor for Berlin-Brandenburg, a role he retained till 1933. He was also employed as a policy leader ("Polleiter ") in the party's "sub-region north" ("Unterbezirk Nord"), in which capacity he worked closely with Walter Ulbricht. On 24 April 1932 Willy Sägebrecht was elected to membership of the Prussian regional parliament ("Landtag"). He was involved in a significant brawl in the parliament between Communist and Nazi members on 21 May 1932.

=== Nazi years ===
The Nazi Party took power at the start of 1933 and lost no time in transforming Germany into a one-party dictatorship. On 4 April 1933 Sägebrecht and Max Herm, his comrade in the local leadership team ("Bezirksleitung"), were arrested. They were subjected to physical mistreatment by Nazi paramilitaries at a nearby barracks and then taken to Sonnenburg concentration camp. Sägebrecht was released at the end of October 1933. He made contact with Albert Kayser, formerly a Communist member of the national parliament ("Reichstag"), and returned to party work - now illegal - in the Berlin sub-region. He was re-arrested on 17 December 1934.

In January 1936 Sägebrecht faced the special people's court and was convicted on the relatively unusual charge of "intellectual activism" ("intellektuelle Willenstäterschaft"). He was sentenced to a five-year jail term, but in the event he spent the rest of the Nazi period in a succession of prisons and concentration camps, released only in April 1945. His final transfer came in March 1941 and saw him sent to Sachsenhausen concentration camp. With other "political detainees" he created a "party group". Observing the divisions among the Nazi camp administrators they were able to identify which guards might prove helpful if cultivated, and by this method they managed to receive regular newspapers and other snippets of news about Germany from outside the camp. There were times when prisoners were sent to work outside the camp, and on one of these occasions the "party group" around Sägebrecht managed to throw from the truck a number of anti-Hitler leaflets that they had managed to produce inside the concentration camp.

During the early months of 1945 the Soviet army advanced relentlessly from the east, and in April the authorities in Germany desperately raced to empty the concentration camps. Sachsenhausen inmates were evicted and sent on forced marches (death marches) towards the west and north, but as discipline collapsed it was increasingly the guards themselves who fled. Sources state simply that in the course of the death march from Sachsenhausen towards Schwerin Willy Sägebrecht was freed by Soviet troops near Below.

=== Soviet occupation zone ===
Directly following the liberation, in the middle of May 1945 Sägebrecht became a member of the Communist Party Initiative Group around his old comrade, Walter Ulbricht. On 30 April 1945 Ulbricht had been flown over from Moscow, where with many comrades he had spent the war, bringing a group of 30 men and, as matter turned out, a detailed and well thought through nation-building agenda. The entire region surrounding Berlin - roughly the middle third of Germany - was now administered as the Soviet occupation zone. Sägebrecht was employed by the Berlin city administration ("Magistratverwaltung") in the social welfare section. He also engaged, from Potsdam, in re-establishing a party leadership team ("KPD-Provinzialleitung Brandenburg"), becoming the Brandenburg regional party secretary.

At the party conference of 2/3 March 1946 Willy Sägebrecht was one of 19 party officials co-opted onto the Party Central Committee. A few weeks later, on 7 April 1946, the contentious special conference took place at which the old Communist Party was merged with the Social Democratic Party (SPD) in order to create the Socialist Unity Party ("Sozialistische Einheitspartei Deutschlands" / SED). The merger, which as events turned out was only directly implemented in the Soviet occupation zone, was intended to unite the political left and thereby make it impossible for right wing populists to take power, as had happened in 1933. Sägebrecht gave a lead as one of thousands of comrades who lost no time in signing their Communist Party memberships across to the new party. By the time the Soviet Occupation Zone was relaunched, in October 1949, as the Soviet sponsored German Democratic Republic (East Germany) the SED had itself become the ruling party in a new kind of German one-party dictatorship.

Under the Leninist power structure implemented in the Soviet Occupation Zone after 1946, political power was centralised on the Party Central Committee. The political influence of parliaments or of government ministers was relatively constrained. However, the centralisation of power was to some extent blurred by the fact that the same individuals often held positions of influence both within the Central Committee and in the quasi-democratic institutions. Willy Sägebrecht was a case in point, sitting as a member of the People's Council ("Volksrat") and then of its successor body, the East German national parliament ("Volkskammer") between 1948 and 1958. In 1950 he became, in addition, a member of the National Council of the National Front, the administrative structure used by the SED to control the allocation of parliamentary seats to bloc parties and mass organisations.

Between 1946 and 1950 he sat as a member of the Brandenburg Regional Parliament ("Landtag Brandenburg"). From 1946 till 1949 he also shared the chairmanship of the regional Party Executive for Brandenburg with Friedrich Ebert Jr. In December 1948 Ebert, who was son to the first president of the German Republic, became mayor of East Berlin, vacating his position as co-chair of the regional party executive. Sägebrecht remained in post, now sharing the top job in the Brandenburg regional party executive with Paul Bismark till July 1952. Between 1949 and 1952 Willy Sägebrecht also served as first secretary of the Brandenburg Party Executive. He was fully engaged in the Stalinisation of the Brandenburg party.

=== German Democratic Republic ===
In July 1952 Sagebrecht was appointed a secretary of state and first deputy chairman at the State Planning Commission ("Staatliche Plankommission"). In 1954 he was diverted into the quasi-military "Kasernierte Volkspolizei" (KVP) police service, appointed a KVP colonel in October 1954. He was responsible for "Administration Co-ordination" which according to at least one source was a "camouglage designation" for Military Intelligence.

In 1945 the World War victors were agreed that no future German state should be permitted to have an army. Ten years later, Cold War rivalries were calling that wartime consensus into question. To the west, the American, British and French occupation zones were merged and relaunched as the German Federal Republic (West Germany) in May 1949, and the West German army (Bundeswehr) was inaugurated in November 1955. In the former Soviet occupation zone (East Germany), it now transpired - at least from the western perspective - that the quasi-military "Kasernierte Volkspolizei" "police service" had been created to be a national East German army by another name: in March 1956 it was duly launched as the National People's Army (" Nationale Volksarmee"). Within it, in September 1957 Willy Sägebrecht became head of military intelligence in succession to Karl Linke who had become suspected (correctly) of spying on behalf of "the west". In the event of some sort of an east–west war, Sägebrecht's responsibilities would have included masterminding and conducting force-based operations in West Germany, including the activation of partisan networks.

Sägebrecht himself was retired from his military intelligence responsibilities in August 1959, officially on health grounds. In the words of one source "he was not successful". His "retirement" came shortly after a senior member of his department, Siegfried Dombrowski, had fled to West Berlin. His successor, appointed on 31 August 1959, was another senior member of the department, Arthur Franke, whom he had first met in 1945 as the two of them fled from the concentration camp.

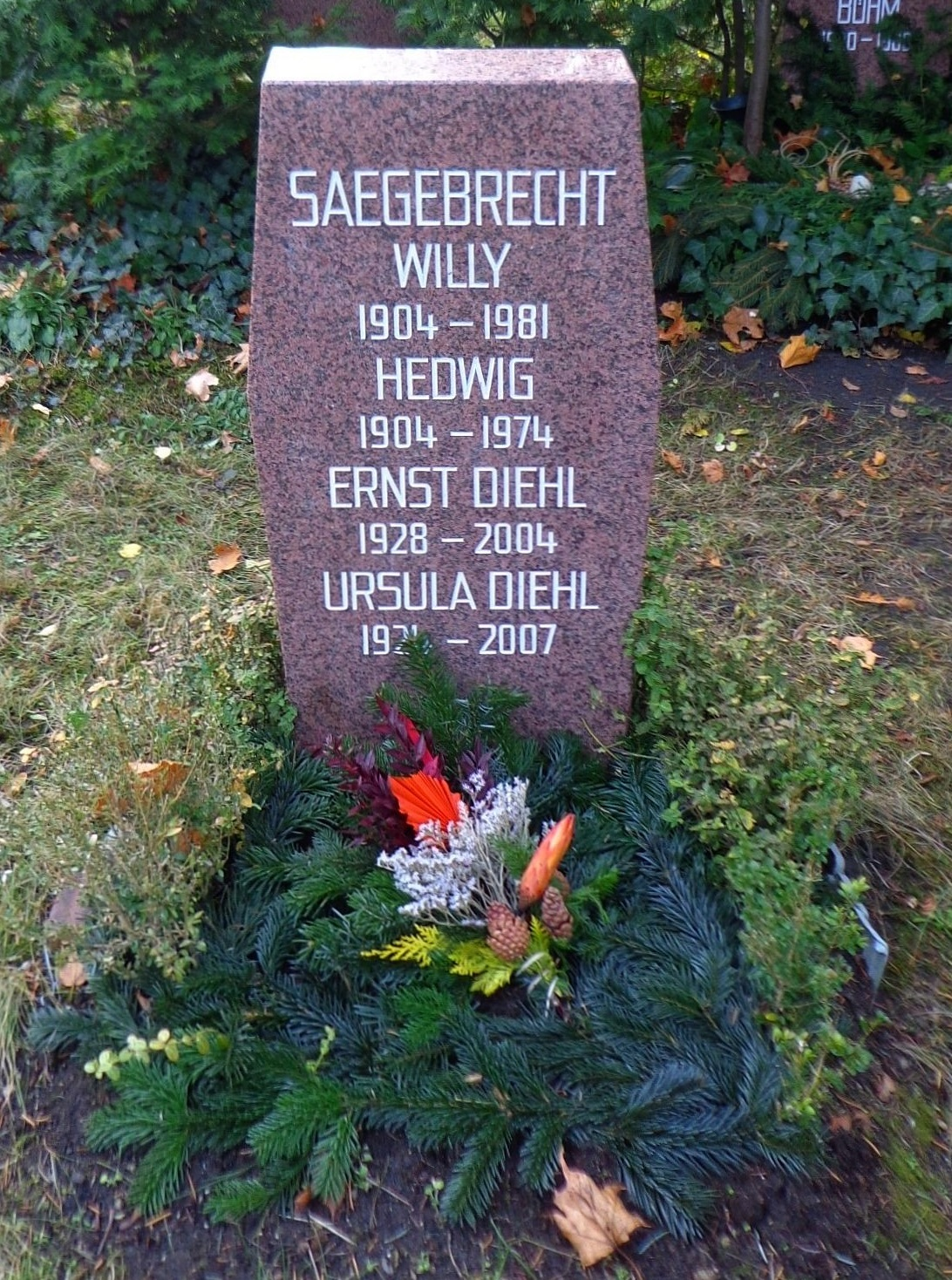
Sägebrecht's grave in the Zentralfriedhof Friedrichsfelde

There is no indication that Sägebrecht's own loyalty to the regime was ever in question: he remained a Party Central Committee member till 1963. However, after September 1959 he lived as a pensioner in East Berlin. In 1968 he published his memoires under the title "Nicht Amboß, sondern Hammer sein" (loosely "Not an anvil but a hammer"). When he died, in 1981, his ashes were placed at the Friedrichsfelde Cemetery in the Gedenkstätte der Sozialisten ("Socialists' Memorial Garden"), alongside those of others whose memories the government celebrated and revered.

== Awards and celebration ==
- 1955 Patriotic Order of Merit in silver
- 1964 Patriotic Order of Merit in gold
- 1979 Order of Karl Marx
- 1979 Patriotic Order of Merit gold clasp
- 1981 The VEB Wälzlagerwerk (Rolling-element bearing factory at Luckenwalde was renamed to include the name "Willy Sägebrecht" in its full name
- 1987 The "Artillerieabteilung 1 in Beelitz" artillery company was renamed as the "Willy Sägebrecht" artillery company
