= Günter Glende =

German politician (1918–2004)

Head of the Management of Party Enterprises Department of the Central Committee
- In office 12 February 1964 – 3 December 1989
- Secretary: Otto Schön; Gisela Glende; Edwin Schwertner
- Deputy: Heinz Simon
- Preceded by: Walter Heibich
- Succeeded by: Position abolished

Personal details
- Born: 9 January 1918 Stolp, Province of Pomerania, Kingdom of Prussia, German Empire (now Słupsk, Poland)
- Died: 27 March 2004 (aged 86) Berlin, Germany
- Party: Socialist Unity Party (1946–1989)
- Other political affiliations: Communist Party of Germany (1946)
- Spouse: Gisela Trautzsch (m. 1973; died 2004)
- Education: Deutsche Akademie für Staats- und Rechtswissenschaft (DASR) „Walter Ulbricht“
- Occupation: Politician; Party Functionary; Machinist
- Awards: Patriotic Order of Merit, 1st class; Banner of Labor

Günter Glende (9 January 1918 – 27 March 2004) was an East German party official. Between 1964 and 1989 he served as leader of the Central Committee's department for administering the Party Enterprises in succession to Walter Heibich.

He was the husband of Gisela Glende from 1973 till his death.

== Life ==
Günter Glende was born into a working-class family in Stolp (as Słupsk was known before) 1918), an industrial town a short distance to the west of Danzig. After attending school locally he completed an apprenticeship as an electrician and agricultural machinery engineer. In 1938 he was conscripted for national labour service ("Reichsarbeitsdienst"). During 1940/41 he studied for a year at the aircraft technical schools in Berlin and on the edge of Jüterbog. He then undertook his military service as a pilot in the German army between 1941 and 1945.

After May 1945, Glende found himself living in the Soviet occupation zone of Germany, which became the Soviet sponsored "German Democratic Republic" (East Germany) after October 1949. With the Hitler regime consigned to history, membership of a political party (other than the ruling party) was no longer illegal, and at some point during 1945 Günter Glende joined the Communist Party.

In April 1946 a contentious merger took place between the Communist Party and the Social Democratic Party. There are indications that the architects of the merger intended that it should be implemented across all four occupation zones, but in the event it never took effect beyond the Soviet zone, where it was actively supported by the military administration. Backers of the merger were determined that political divisions on the political left should never again be permitted to open the way for a seizure of power by a populist nationalist government as had happened in 1933. Günter Glende was one of hundreds of thousands of Communist Party members (and a lesser number of Social Democrats who hastened to sign their party membership across to the new Socialist Unity Party ("Sozialistische Einheitspartei Deutschlands" / SED), no doubt using one of the pre-printed forms that the authorities had helpfully distributed to facilitate matters. Between 1946 and 1948 he supported himself as a specialist engineer, working on agricultural machinery on the Moltow estate in the Wismar region, while simultaneously serving as the local mayor. As changes in land ownership were implemented, he also secured himself a job as an "[agricultural] machinery officer" ("Maschinenbeauftragter") with the Wismar branch of the "Peasants Mutual Aid Association" ("Vereinigung der gegenseitigen Bauernhilfe" / VdgB), one of five new Soviet style mass organisations, established in order to broaden the political power base of the ruling party (SED), which controlled the mass organisations through the so-called "National Front" organisation. Under the land reforms of 1945 land owners owning more than 100 hectares of land (and other lesser land owners identified by the authorities as war criminals) were dispossessed of their lands. This meant that the great landed estates which traditionally had been a feature central and eastern Prussia were broken up. Unfortunately the poor quality of the relatively unproductive sandy soil remained unaffected by the changes. The land freed up was allocated to a newly identified class of "Neubauer" (new farmers). In 1948 Glende was allocated a piece of agricultural land on what had been the Moltow estate.

On 1949 Glende moved on from his position with the Wismar VdgB), becoming instead Technical Director of the "Maschinen-Ausleih-Station" (MAS / "Machinery rental station") and later also of the associated "Maschinen-Traktoren-Station" (MTS / "Machine tractor station") at Dorf Mecklenburg. (In the Soviet Union and allied socialist states of central Europe, heavy farm machinery, when not in use, was normally kept securely out of the hands of comrades working on the collective farms: it was instead centrally stored and maintained.) During 1951/52 Glende combined his duties at the MAS and MTS with work as a technical tutor at the Mecklensburg MAS Agricultural College in nearby Güstrow.

A superficially paradoxical aspect of the Leninist power structure applied in East Germany and other Soviet-bloc states, which western observers sometimes found hard to comprehend, was the extent to which the ruling party aspired to make itself ubiquitous. Evidence that Günter Glende's abilities and political reliability had been noticed came in 1953 when he was sent to Potsdam on a course of study at the "Walter Ulbricht" Academy for Civil Law and Jurisprudence ("Akademie für Staats- und Rechtswissenschaft"). When he returned home to the north he had become secretary to the Güstrow district council.

Additionally, between 1953 and 1958 Glende served as an instructor in the Central Committee's Department for Mechanical Engineering and Metallurgy. (The instruction in question is likely to have been primarily party-political in nature.) In 1958 he switched to the Central Committee department for administering the party enterprises where he briefly worked as a divisional director before being switched the headship of transport services. Between 1961 and 1964 he was deputy head of the entire department and then, between 1964 and 1989, head of department in succession to Walter Heibich.

Meanwhile, in 1960 it became known that Günter Glende had become one of the 111 members of the party Central Committee. This placed him at the heart of the party's – and therefore of the country's – centralised power structure. The absence of source information on his contributions to central committee deliberations suggests that he was a quietly loyal member, and never part of the leader's inner circle. The unbroken succession of conventional honours that he received over the years tell their own story. Between 1962 and 1989 Günter Glende chaired the Central Committee's Audit Commission for Party Organisation ("Revisionskommission der Parteiorganisation") which presumably monitored party officials for signs of political unreliability. East Germany was a closely monitored society, and even Central Committee members were not spared the unstinting surveillance of the Stasi. It is noteworthy, however, that when the Stasi files were accessed by researchers after German reunification, it was found that although surveillance files for Glende existed, and the security services were clearly aware in considerable detail of the "personal advantages" that he amassed from his public office, the Stasi boss Erich Mielke never took any actions against Glende. The historian Rüdiger Bergien in his 2017 study of "The [East German] Party General Staff" between 1946 and 1989, writes of a certain "Beißhemmung" the MfS had when it came to members of the "party general staff": they indeed still collected a lot of surveillance material on the individuals in question, but they did not use it politically.

In his capacity as head of the party Central Committee's "Abteilung Verwaltung der Wirtschaftsbetriebe" Günter Glende was one of a handful of senior party officials who was able to exercise influence over the assets and financing of the SED. Others with similar levels of control were the head of the secret Department for Commercial Coordination (currency smuggling) inside the Minister for Foreign Trade, Alexander Schalck-Golodkowski, the Head of the Department for Financial Management and Party Businesses, Heinz Wildenhain, the Head of Planning and Finance Department, Günter Ehrensperger and Julius "Johnny" Cebulla, the top man at the Central Committee's Trafficking Department.

== Awards and honours ==
- 1964 Patriotic Order of Merit in bronze
- 1968 Patriotic Order of Merit in silver
- 1969 Banner of Labor
- 1978 Patriotic Order of Merit in gold
- 1979 Banner of Labor
- 1981 Banner of Labor 1st Class
- 1983 Patriotic Order of Merit gold clasp
