= Central Auditing Commission of the Socialist Unity Party of Germany =

Disciplinary body within the Socialist Unity Party of Germany

Central Auditing Commission
- Zentrale Revisionskommission
- Logo of the Socialist Unity Party of Germany

Agency overview
- Formed: July 1950
- Preceding agency: Auditing Commission
- Dissolved: December 1989
- Jurisdiction: East Germany
- Headquarters: Haus am Werderschen Markt, East Berlin
- Employees: 9 (1986)
- Agency executives: Kurt Seibt, Chairman; Karl-Heinz Lorber, Deputy Chairman
- Parent department: Party Congress

The Central Auditing Commission (German: Zentrale Revisionskommission) (ZRK) was a body of the Socialist Unity Party of Germany (SED) mainly tasked with ensuring orderly party finances and work of the party organs.

Compared to the Central Party Control Commission, which enforced party discipline, the ZRK's power was limited.

== History ==
An Auditing Commission was first set up at the founding party conference in April 1946.

Analogous to the CPSU Central Auditing Commission, it was converted to the Central Auditing Commission at the III. Party Congress of the SED in July 1950, which also elected Alfred Oelßner, former head cashier of the KPD and SED, as its first chairman.

== Work ==
The ZRK was mainly tasked with controlling the SED's finances, in particular the collection and accounting of membership fees. Additionally, it performed financial audits in the party apparatus and party enterprises such as the Dietz publishing house.

Aside from finances, the ZRK was tasked with ensuring orderly work of the party organs in general, especially if petitions by party members and citizens at large were processed appropriately. It also "oversaw" the work of other auditing commissions in mass organizations such as the FDGB's ZRK.

The ZRK de jure only reported to the party congress and stood aside the Central Committee. However, de facto, the ZRK was not able to independently audit the central party apparatus, as the later did not have to divulge information. The ZRK's limited jurisdiction furthermore made it significantly less powerful than the SED's other disciplinary body, the Central Party Control Commission.

The ZRK originally also investigated petitions addressing problems in industrial enterprises, to the detriment of Central Committee Secretary for economics Günter Mittag. On one such occasion, Mittag was able to discredit the ZRK's report, after which it largely ceased its controls in the economy.

== Structure ==
=== Subordinate bodies ===
The ZRK had subordinate bodies: the Bezirk (or, until the administrative reform in 1952, the state-level auditing commissions) and the district-level auditing commissions of the SED. The SED also had so-called functional district organisations in large universities, ministries such as the Ministry for State Security and other institutions, and these also had auditing commissions.

All of these commissions officially worked at their own discretion in regards to their audits, but were still bound by the directives of the ZRK and were obligated to report to it. The auditing commissions could not issue penalties directly, but were required to give recommendations in regards to punishments to the leadership of their respective party organization and control their implementation. Gross violations had to be reported to the next highest auditing commission immediately.

=== Composition ===
The ZRK's members and candidate members, largely unpaid except for a few staff members, were elected by the party congress. The ZRK's membership grew over the course of its existence; whereas the ZRK had nineteen full members (excluding the chairman and deputy chairman) and four candidate members in 1970, the ZRK elected by the XI. Party Congress in April 1986 was composed of forty full members and eight candidate members.

Being a member of the ZRK was usually incompatible with being a Central Committee member, chairman Kurt Seibt being a notable exception. Members did not need to have any formal qualifications in auditing.

Notable members include Günter Sieber (1963–1967), Heinz Kuhrig (1971–1976), Werner Eberlein (1971–1981), Bruno Mahlow junior (1981–1989), and Gisela Glende (1986–1989), who was pushed away to the ZRK after her forced retirement as head of the Office of the Politburo.

=== Leadership ===
The ZRK's leading official was a chairman who led the commission's work, prepared its meetings and kept party leadership informed. The chairman and deputy chairman were officially selected at the ZRK's inaugural meeting after a party congress.

Chairmen of the Central Auditing Commission
Chairman	Tenure
Alfred Oelßner	July 1950 – April 1954
Fritz Gäbler	April 1954 – April 1967
Kurt Seibt	April 1967 – December 1989

The chairman was assisted by a deputy chairman, notably Sepp Hahn under Fritz Gäbler, and Karl-Heinz Lorber under Kurt Seibt.
