= Günter Sieber =

East German diplomat and party functionary (1930–2006)

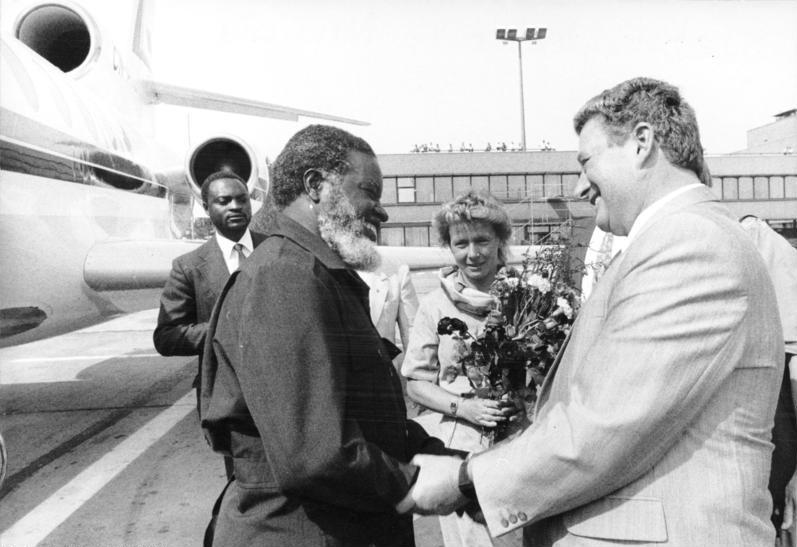
- Sieber (right) with SWAPO president Sam Nujoma in 1989

Head of the International Relations Department of the Central Committee
- In office 7 July 1980 – 8 November 1989
- Secretary: Hermann Axen
- Deputy: Bruno Mahlow; Friedel Trappen
- Preceded by: Egon Winkelmann
- Succeeded by: Bruno Mahlow

Ambassador to the Polish People's Republic
- In office July 1973 – December 1980
- Preceded by: Rudolf Rossmeisl
- Succeeded by: Horst Neubauer

Minister for Trade and Supply
- In office 25 March 1965 – 22 November 1972
- Chairman of the Council of Ministers: Willi Stoph
- First Deputy: Helmut Richter; Kurt Lemke; Kurt Bernheier
- Preceded by: Gerhard Lucht
- Succeeded by: Gerhard Briksa
Volkskammer
Member of the Volkskammer
In office 16 June 1986 – 5 April 1990
Preceded by	Leonhard Helmschrott
Succeeded by	Constituency abolished
Constituency	Burg, Schönebeck, Staßfurt, Zerbst, №2
In office 25 June 1981 – 16 June 1986
Preceded by	Elke Arnold
Succeeded by	Horst Kreter
Constituency	Brandenburg-Stadt, Brandenburg-Land, Belzig, Rathenow №4

Central Committee Secretariat responsibilities
- Nov. – Dec. 1989: International Relations Department
- Nov. – Dec. 1989: International Politics and Economics Department

Personal details
- Born: 11 March 1930 Ilmenau, Free State of Thuringia, Weimar Republic (now Germany)
- Died: 26 November 2006 (aged 76) Strausberg, Brandenburg, Germany
- Party: Socialist Unity Party (1948–1989)
- Education: Deutsche Verwaltungsakademie; "Karl Marx" Party Academy; Zentralinstitut für sozialistische Wirtschaftsführung beim ZK der SED
- Occupation: Politician; Party Functionary; Diplomat; Civil Servant
- Central institution membership: 1989: Candidate member, Politburo of the Central Committee; 1981–1989: Full member, Central Committee; 1976–1981: Candidate member, Central Committee; 1963–1967: Full member, Central Auditing Commission; Other offices held: 1963–1965: First Deputy Chairman, Workers' and Peasants' Inspection

Günter Sieber (11 March 1930 – 26 November 2006) was an East German politician, diplomat and party functionary of the Socialist Unity Party (SED).

Starting off as an official in the State Planning Commission, during his forty-year-long career in East Germany, Sieber served as Trade and Supply Minister, ambassador to the Polish People's Republic and as the head of the International Relations Department of the Central Committee of the SED, where he, among other things, coordinated East Germany's response to martial law in Poland and expanded the SED's involvement in Africa. During the Peaceful Revolution, he was also briefly part of the Politburo of the Central Committee of the SED as a candidate member, and as the last Secretary of the Central Committee responsible for foreign affairs.

== Life and career ==
=== Early life ===
Günter Sieber was born in 1930 in Ilmenau to a working-class family. After attending Volksschule, he completed apprenticeship as a forestry worker from 1944 to 1947. Immediately after World War II, he joined the newly founded Free German Trade Union Federation (FDGB), soon taking on local functionary roles. In 1948, he joined the ruling Socialist Unity Party (SED) and became an employee of the German Economic Commission.

After a year at the German Economic Commission, he attended the Deutsche Verwaltungsakademie in Forst Zinna, de facto a Marxist–Leninist cadre factory of the SED, from 1949 to 1950. Concurrently, from 1949, he served as a Referent, a low to mid-level ministerial position in East Germany, in the Ministry of Planning, rising to Hauptreferent and head of the forestry department in its successor, the State Planning Commission, the following year. After a one-year course at the SED's "Karl Marx" Party Academy in Berlin, he was made party secretary in the State Planning Commission in 1954, a position he would hold for the next eight years.

In 1962, he was appointed deputy chairman of the Central Commission for State Control (German: Zentrale Kommission für Staatliche Kontrolle) (ZKSK) at the Council of Ministers, a disciplinary organ for the economy and state apparatus. When the ZKSK was replaced by the Workers' and Peasants' Inspection the following year, he was promoted to first deputy chairman in May 1963, having already been elected to the SED's Central Auditing Commission for one term in January (VI. Party Congress).

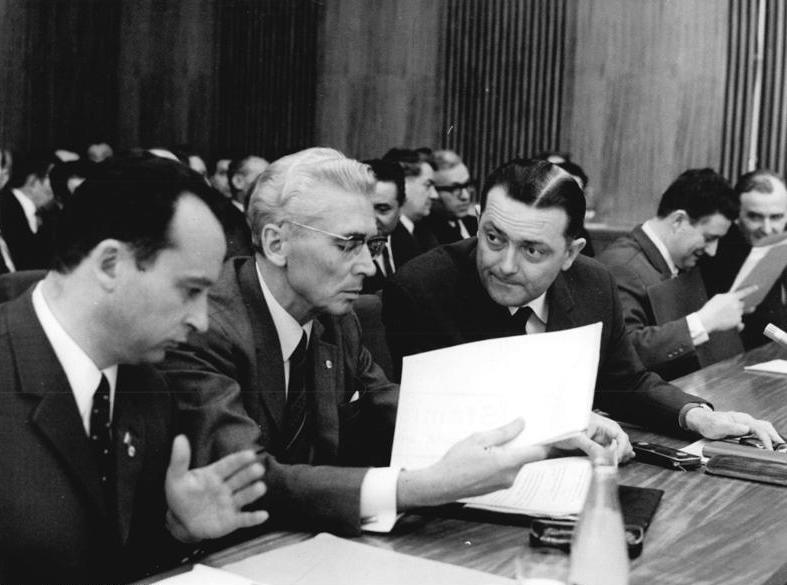
Minister Sieber (second from the right) at a session of the State Council in April 1970

Sieber was made Minister for Trade and Supply in March 1965. During his tenure, he also completed distance learning at the SED's Central Institute for Socialist Economic Management. He had to leave this position in November 1972 following criticism by the Central Committee targeted at the ministry's work. He was transferred to the East German diplomatic service in July 1973 as ambassador to the Polish People's Republic. During his diplomatic tenure, in May 1976 (IX. Party Congress), he was elected to the Central Committee of the SED as a candidate member. He returned to East Berlin in December 1980.

=== International Relations Department ===
On 7 July 1980, he was appointed head of the International Relations Department of the Central Committee, succeeding Egon Winkelmann, who was made ambassador to the Soviet Union after only two years as department head.

Sieber later became a full member of the Central Committee of the SED in April 1981 (X. Party Congress), serving until its collective resignation in December 1989. He additionally became a member of the Volkskammer in 1981, nominally representing rural constituencies, first in western Bezirk Potsdam, then in southern Bezirk Magdeburg.

The International Relations Department was responsible for preparing Politburo decisions that concerned foreign policy issues and to control their implementation. As department head, Sieber met foreign leaders, especially leaders of other communist parties and national liberation movements such as SWAPO president Sam Nujoma. Sieber's tenure coincided with an increased involvement of the SED in Africa, particularly Zimbabwe. Among other things, the SED supported the merger of ZAPU and ZANU, Sieber also signing a SED-ZANU cooperation agreement in April 1988 in Harare.

According to Manfred Uschner, personal assistant to Hermann Axen, the Central Committee Secretary responsible for the International Relations Department, Sieber's sturdiness and experience meant that he had an easier time working with the often choleric Axen compared to his more sensitive predecessor Winkelmann. Uschner also notes Sieber's sarcastic and self-ironic tendencies and praises his efforts to keep alive the comparatively open atmosphere of the department the late department head Paul Markowski was known for cultivating.

=== Response to martial law in Poland ===
On 12 December 1981, shortly before midnight, martial law was declared in Poland to crackdown on the growing opposition movement, especially the Solidarność trade union. When Sieber was informed by the East German embassy in Warsaw, he first called defence minister Heinz Hoffmann and Stasi head Erich Mielke, but both of them thought it was a hoax, expecting to have been informed beforehand.

Sieber then attempted to call Erich Honecker directly but was unable to do so as he had taken a sleeping pill after meeting with West German Chancellor Helmut Schmidt at Lake Werbellin. On his own and in what he later described as his "only power grab", Sieber convened a meeting of the Politburo at 3 a.m. to discuss the situation. He had already sent an Interflug plane to evacuate East German citizens, including 90 children, from Warsaw.

=== Peaceful Revolution ===
On 8 November 1989, on the eve of the fall of the Berlin Wall, Sieber rose to the Politburo of the Central Committee of the SED, the de facto highest leadership body in East Germany, as a candidate member. He was additionally elected as a Secretary of the Central Committee, responsible for his own former International Relations Department and the International Politics and Economics Department, succeeding retiring Hermann Axen. Sieber had just returned home when the Berlin Wall fell. Concerned about the foreign relations ramifications, he reached out to General Secretary Egon Krenz and Hans-Joachim Willerding, but neither one of them was able to explain what was going on.

Sieber's career advancement would prove to be short-lived, as the SED quickly lost power. At its last session on 3 December 1989, the Central Committee elected Sieber to a commission tasked with analyzing the causes of the crisis in the SED and in society. He remained a member of the Volkskammer until its first free and fair elections in 1990, going into early retirement afterwards.

== Death ==
He died on 26 November 2006 at age 76 in Strausberg, the former seat of much of the East German military establishment.
