= Kurt Seibt =

German politician (1908–2002)

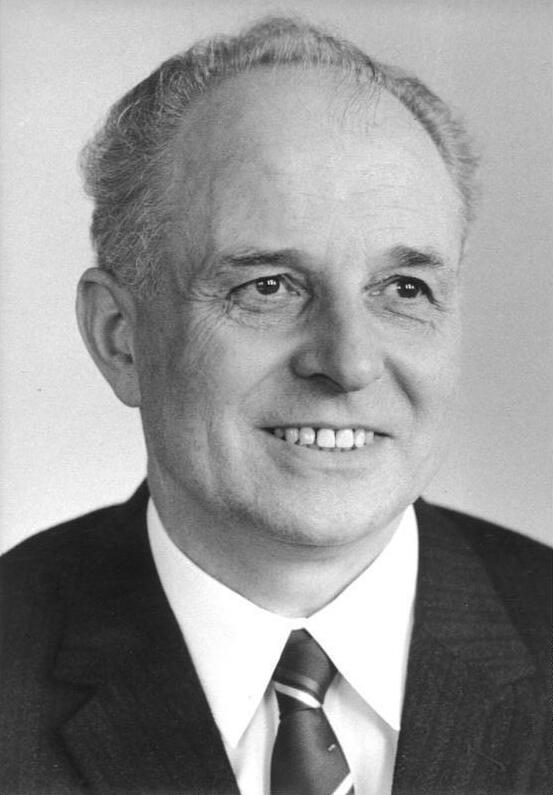
- Seibt in 1967

Chairman of the Central Auditing Commission
- In office 22 April 1967 – 3 December 1989
- General Secretary: Walter Ulbricht; Erich Honecker; Egon Krenz
- Deputy: Karl-Heinz Lorber
- Preceded by: Fritz Gäbler
- Succeeded by: Position abolished

Minister for the Guidance and Control of Bezirk and District Councils
- In office 3 June 1964 – 22 December 1965
- Chairman of the Council of Ministers: Otto Grotewohl; Willi Stoph
- Preceded by: Willi Stoph (as Deputy Chairman of the Council of Ministers)
- Succeeded by: Fritz Scharfenstein

First Secretary of the Socialist Unity Party in Bezirk Potsdam
- In office September 1957 – 3 June 1964
- Second Secretary: Margarete Langner; Hans Nieswand; Siegfried Pohl
- Preceded by: Eduard Götzl (acting)
- Succeeded by: Werner Wittig
- In office 1 August 1952 – April 1956
- Second Secretary: Margarete Langner
- Preceded by: Willy Sägebrecht (as First Secretary of the SED in Brandenburg)
- Succeeded by: Eduard Götzl (acting)
Volkskammer
Member of the Volkskammer
In office 25 November 1953 – 14 July 1967
Preceded by	Heinrich Fried
Succeeded by	multi-member district

Personal details
- Born: Kurt Max Karl Seibt; 13 February 1908 Rixdorf, Province of Brandenburg, Kingdom of Prussia, German Empire (now Berlin-Neukölln, Germany)
- Died: 21 June 2002 (aged 94) Zeuthen, Brandenburg, Germany
- Party: Socialist Unity Party (1946–1989)
- Other political affiliations: Communist Party of Germany (1932–1946)
- Education: CPSU Higher Party School "W. I. Lenin" (Dipl.-Ges.-Wiss.)
- Occupation: Politician; Party Functionary; Construction Worker
- Awards: Patriotic Order of Merit, 1st class; Order of Karl Marx; Grand Star of Peoples' Friendship
- Central institution membership: 1967–1989: Chairman, Central Auditing Commission; 1954–1989: Full member, Central Committee; 1950–1954: Candidate member, Central Committee; Other offices held: 1976–1989: Chairman, Solidarity Committee of the GDR

Kurt Seibt (13 February 1908 in Berlin – 21 June 2002) was chairman of the Central Revision Commission of the Socialist Unity Party of Germany (Sozialistische Einheitspartei Deutschlands; SED) and East Germany's Minister for Direction and Control of Regional and District Councils.

== Biography ==
Seibt completed training as a metal spinner in 1922–1926 and worked until 1933 as a civil engineering worker and a stone setter. In 1922, he joined the Socialist Worker Youth, in 1924 the Young Communist League of Germany (Kommunistischer Jugendverband Deutschlands; KJVD) and in 1932 the Communist Party of Germany (KPD). From 1927 to 1930, he was First Secretary of the KJVD subdistrict of Berlin-Kreuzberg, from 1930 to 1931 State Youth Leader of the Brandenburg Red Sport Unit (Rote Sporteinheit) and a member of the Berlin-Brandenburg KJVD district leadership.

From 1934 to 1939, Seibt was a stagehand and a theatre master at the Deutsches Theater Berlin, and also a member of the outlawed KPD's party leadership. In 1939 he was arrested and in 1941, he was sentenced by the Volksgerichtshof to life at hard labour in a Zuchthaus for "undermining German fighting forces and conspiracy to commit high treason". Thereafter he was an inmate at Brandenburg-Görden Prison in Brandenburg an der Havel until 1945.

From 1945 to 1946, Seibt was the first secretary of the Brandenburg district leadership and a member of the KPD Brandenburg state leadership. From 1946 to 1952, he was secretary of the SED Brandenburg state leadership, and from 1947 to 1952, he was a member of the Landtag of Brandenburg. From 1952 to 1964, he was first secretary of the SED Potsdam district leadership, although this was interrupted by his studies at the CPSU Party College in Moscow in 1956–1957. Moreover, he was from 1950 a candidate, from 1954 to 1989 a member of the SED Central Committee, and from 1953 to 1989 a Member of the Volkskammer.

From 1964 to 1966, Seibt was Minister for Direction and Control of Regional and District Councils and a member of the Presidium of the Council of Ministers, and from 1967 to 1989, succeeding Fritz Gäbler, he was chairman of the SED Central Auditing Commission.

Seibt received the Patriotic Order of Merit (Vaterländischer Verdienstorden) in 1965, the Karl-Marx-Orden in 1968 and 1988, the Clip of Honour for the Fatherland Order of Merit in 1973, the Star of the Friendship of Peoples (Stern der Völkerfreundschaft) in 1978, and the Great Star of the Friendship of Peoples (Großer Stern der Völkerfreundschaft) in 1983.
