= Walter Trautzsch =

German political activist

Walter Trautzsch (16 March 1903 – 23 September 1971) was a German political activist who engaged as an anti-fascist resistance fighter during the Hitler years. Between 1936 and his arrest in 1939 he worked secretly as a courier for the Communist Party leader, Ernst Thälmann.

(Although Thälmann was being held in solitary confinement, he was able to receive parcels and visits from his wife, and indeed had a larger than average cell to facilitate visits: they conversed, in part, by writing messages in chalk on a board in order to thwart listening devices.)

== Life ==
=== Provenance and early years ===
Walter Ehrengott Trautzsch was born in Lengefeld, a small industrial town in the mining region south of Chemnitz, and close to the frontier with Bohemia. His parents worked in the weaving trade. His father is also described as a building worker in at least one source. Walter was the sixth of his parents' seven recorded children. On leaving school, Walter Trautzch successfully completed an apprenticeship in industrial metal forming (als "Metalldrücker"), which was the trade from which he would earn his living, working in various German towns and cities, till 1929. He joined the recently formed Communist Party in June 1923, and participated in the Hamburg Uprising in October of that year. That led to his imprisonment, but he was released in December 1923. He spent six months in Switzerland, but then in 1926 found work closer to home, in Chemnitz. In 1929 his period as an itinerant labourer came to an end when he returned to Lengefeld. A period of unemployment followed, as Germany was badly impacted by the backwash from the Wall Street Crash.

Trautzsch had links with the party's "secret organisation" ("Geheimapparat") as early as 1926. In 1929 he became head of his local "Committee of the Unemployed" ("Erwerbslosenausschuss"), and in 1931, as politics became ever more polarised across the country, and in the face of parliamentary deadlock, he became leader of the local "League against Fascism" ("Antifaschistischen Kampfbund"). That year Trautzsch also visited the Soviet Union as a member of the delegation from "Universum-Bücherei", a short-lived and by this time overtly left-leaning book publishing and dealing organisation. In November 1932, a couple of months before the National Socialists took power, Trautzsch was elected to the Lengefeld town council, on which he sat as a Communist.

=== Hitler years ===
During the first three months of 1933 the newly installed Hitler government transformed Germany into a one-party dictatorship. The Reichstag fire was followed by a savage clamp down on known members of the (by now illegal) Communist: Walter Trautzsch was arrested by Nazi paramilitaries on 3 March 1933 and taken into "protective custody", becoming one of the first inmates at Colditz Castle, following its conversion into a political prison. He was subsequently transferred to the Sachsenburg concentration camp. He was released in September 1934 and returned to his political activities, becoming the leader of an illegal communist resistance group in and around Lengefeld.

In September 1935 he emigrated to the Soviet Union, using the pseudonym "Paul Wittig", in compliance with party instructions that he take part in the party's "Brussels Conference" (as it was billed in advance so as to confuse the German security services) in Moscow. The German Communist Party subsequently recorded the Brussels Conference as their thirteenth party conference. The next year he was ordered to move on to Prague in connection with "party work", but was arrested at the Czechoslovak frontier. In the border town of Most as "Most" was known at that time nown as Brüx) he was sentenced to two months imprisonment, presumably in connection with his illegal Communist Party involvement. However, by the summer of 1936 he had made his way to Prague which, along with Moscow and Paris, had become the principal operational centre for the exiled German Communist Party.

=== Thälmann courier ===
The leading party figure in Prague was Walter Ulbricht, an exceptionally ambitious comrade who would emerge in 1949 as the political leader of the freshly launched German Democratic Republic. According to at least one source it was Ulbricht who mandated Trautszch to become the new courier to maintain links between the party's leader, Ernst Thälmann, held in solitary confinement (at this stage) in Berlin, and senior party figures at liberty, but exiled in Prague and Paris. The role was one which was considered a very great honour, but it was also highly secret. Few comrades were aware of Trautzsch's important activity, and details of precisely what was involved remained unclear. One man who did know about the arrangement was Franz Dahlem, and it was only when Dahlem's memoires were published by the Institute of Marxism–Leninism in East Berlin in the mid-1960s that historians in East Germany learned of it, at least in outline. In August 1936 "Edwin" (the cover name by which Walter Trautzsch was now being identified by comrades) traveled illegally to Nazi Germany. As the threat of German annexation loomed over Czechoslovakia, senior German communists tended to relocate from Prague to Moscow or Paris, and "Edwin's" later missions were from Paris rather than from Prague. Between August 1936 and February 1939 he undertook at least eighteen courier missions at intervals of between four and six weeks, in order to meet up with Rosa Thälmann, the party leader's wife who lived in Hamburg. Meetings sometimes took place in Berlin, which was closer to the prisons in which the government were holding Ernst Thälmann. It is unclear how far the messages he carried were written down, and how far they were dependent on the quality of his memory. One source refers to "Edwin" providing dictated reports which were written down by Hermann Nuding, by this time based in Paris, who then took care to pass the completed transcripts to Moscow. Between missions Trautzsch was persuaded to lead an exceptionally lonely and isolated life, based in a series of inconspicuous hotels in and around Paris, but taking care never to stay in the same hotel for longer than fourteen days. Ulbricht, who was based in Paris till approximately 1938, continued to provide "close managerial involvement", would not even allow him to go out to a concert. His missions and, indeed, his existence continued to be concealed, though a few of Ulbricht's more senior comrades, including Paul Merker and Paul Bertz, did become aware of Trautzsch.

As time went on the isolation to which he was subjected under Ulbricht's uncompromising control seemed to be affecting Trautzsch adversely. During 1938 Ulbricht spent more time in Moscow, and by Autumn/Fall he was no longer based in Paris. During the Summer of 1938 Wilhelm Pieck, recognising the desolate mental condition to which he had been reduced, arranged for a replacement. It was Ernst and Rosa Thälmann themselves who firmly rejected that idea, however. With Ulbricht out of the way it increasingly fell to Franz Dahlem, Anton Ackermann, Hermann Nuding and Paul Bertz to manage the party's "Thälmann courier". Dahlem now saw to it that back in Paris, in between his courier trips, "Edwin" was at least permitted to visit the opera and theatres. During the Autumn/Fall of 1938 they even arranged an eight-day holiday for him at the little port town and beach resort of Saint-Malo, in company with the recently returned veteran of the Spanish Civil War, Walter Beling.

=== War years ===
During the course of a courier mission, on 16 February 1939 "Edwin" was subjected to a random control inspection on the train between Brussels and Aachen. He was in possession of a Swiss passport in which he was identified as "Wilhelm Bossard". The officials were not persuaded by the false identity document and suspected, initially, that they had intercepted a French spy. Trautzsch was taken to the Gestapo's main interrogation centre in Berlin. Here his interrogators quickly identified him as one of the "most wanted" German communists on their lists. Under such circumstances, Trautzsch had already received unambiguous instructions from Dahlem that he should commit suicide in order to avoid the risk of betraying comrades. Trautzsch's first attempt to carry out that instruction was unsuccessful, however, and was immediately followed by an unexpected (and unusual) further development. His interrogators offered him a job as a courier, working for agencies of the German government. Trautzsch arrived in Paris on 24 February 1939 and immediately told his comrades about this development. Any detailed records of his activities in Paris during the middle part of 1939 have been lost in the turmoil of war which broke out in September 1939. It appears that the would-be double agent was not trusted by the Communist leadership in Paris, and there is no surviving evidence of his having undertaken courier work on behalf of the German authorities. He was nevertheless seen by comrades as a possible "V-Mann" (Gestapo informant). There was certainly no question of his resuming his activities as the Communist Party's "Thälmann courier". Party leaders were keen that he should relocate to Moscow, but he was clearly unwell, and probably sufficiently aware of his situation to know that a move to Moscow as a suspected traitor was likely to be fatal. Any possibility of such a relocation was in any case overtaken by the outbreak of war.

Following the outbreak of war, like many German political and/or racially disadvantaged refugees from Nazism who had thought they had found refuge in Paris and London, Walter Trautzsch was identified as an enemy alien and interned in a series of holding camps in southwest France. The camps in question had been hastily established in 1938 as holding camps for returning fighters following the defeat of the antifascists in the Spanish Civil War. They tended to be located in remote locations, often at the far end of a meteorologically hostile mountain valley; but during the first part of the war, even after May/June 1940 when German armies over-ran northern France and installed a puppet government to administer the southern half of the country, escaping from French internment camps was very far from impossible. Sources differ over whether it was in 1940 or 1941 that Walter Trautzsch made his escape. He evidently acquired effective false identity documents from somewhere, and after a brief and apparently unsatisfactory hotel meeting with Anton Ackermann, who seems to have escaped internment and to have been living "underground", still in France, at this point, Trautzsch succeeded in crossing the border first into Belgium and then, using some characteristically circuitous (and "adventurous") route, into Switzerland where, using another false identity, he was able to present himself to the authorities as "Kurt Schneider" a Czechoslovak refugee. (For historical reasons, before 1945 Czechoslovakia was home to approximately two million ethnic Germans with German names.)

During this time he teamed up with other communist political exiles from Germany who had managed to find their way to Switzerland including, notably, Maria Weiterer, Leo Bauer and Fritz Sperling. He also met up with 1946 Rosemarie Müggli (1918–1974), a Swiss woman whom he married shortly after the war ended. Their first son was born in 1946.

=== Soviet occupation zone ===
During 1945, with Nazism defeated, the central third of what had been Germany - including Trautzsch's home region in south-western Saxony - ended up under Soviet Military Administration. The Soviet occupation zone was subsequently relaunched in October 1949 as the Soviet sponsored German Democratic Republic (East Germany). Walter Trautzsch returned to the Soviet zone with Rosemarie in August 1946. For the first time in more than ten years he was no longer living "illegally" (unregistered).

Five months before his return the Communist Party had been replaced by the Socialist Unity Party of Germany ("Sozialistische Einheitspartei Deutschlands" / SED), following a contentious merger in April 1946. The merger had, in most respects, been restricted to the Soviet occupation zone where it enjoyed strong support from the military administration. It heralded the emergence of a new kind of one-party dictatorship, in which the fiction of political pluralism was preserved, while all the political parties were in reality tightly controlled by the ruling party. Trautzsch immediately returned to party work, taking a post as first party district secretary for Glauchau rural district during 1946/47. During 1947/48 he served as chair of the local party in Glauchau. Between 1948 and 1952 he was employed by the Dresden-based state leadership for Saxony.

=== Fall ===
During 1952/53 Trautzsch was a member - and, according to one source, the chairman - of the Party Control Commission (PCC) based in nearby Leipzig. The PCC was responsible for the enforcement of party discipline. There was therefore an inescapable irony in the fact that in 1954 Trautzsch himself fell foul of the institutional paranoia, displayed with a new intensity by the national leadership in the aftermath of the (brutally but effectively crushed) uprising in June 1953. One feature that the East Germany dictatorship shared with the earlier German one-party dictatorship was a savagely comprehensive approach to record keeping. Someone checked out some old files and found evidence of obligations to work for the Gestapo, to which (the "Central Party Control Commission" ("Zentrale Parteikontrollkommission" / ZPKK) determined) Trautzsch had agreed, following his arrest on a train near Aachen back in February 1939. He was also condemned as a "Westemigrant". That was a reference to the continuing mistrust that Walter Ulbricht and his colleagues at the top of the party hierarchy (who had almost all spent the war years in Moscow) felt towards the minority of party comrades who had instead spent the war years in "the west". As a result of this, it was suspected, they must have become contaminated by western ideas, and therefore be (quietly) critical of "Soviet Socialism". Walter Trautzsch's political career went into rapid reverse. (His former handler from his time in Paris Paul Merker, a particularly highly placed "Westemigrant", had already suffered the same fate two years earlier.) Trautszsch lost his position on the regional Party Control Commission (PCC) in 1954, and was subjected to a rapid loss of position and status during the next couple of years. From having been a cadre leader at a state enterprise, he became an agricultural worker or, at one stage, a lift/elevator attendant. Matters were arranged so that after this his three sons grew up almost entirely without him. He also saw little of his Swiss-born wife, Rosemarie, who divorced him in 1961. That was not enough to prevent her from falling into disfavour, and being punished just as Walter had been.

Walter Trautzsch had suffered from poor health for some years, and during the 1950s he suffered bouts of illness with increasing frequency. In 1959 he retired early on health grounds. In the mid 1960s it was Franz Dahlem, who had undergone his own tribulations with the ZPKK during the previous fifteen years, spoke out on behalf of Walter Trautzsch. Dahlem was no longer the powerful figure he had been in the early 1950s, but his insistence that Trautzsch, who was by now a lonely and increasingly embittered comrade, deserved to be recognized and honoured for the services he had provided to the party and its leaders during the 1930s. Recognition came in 1964 (or according to one source 1966) in the form of the Patriotic Order of Merit in silver. It was not the highest level of the award that the government might have chosen for him, but nor was it the lowest.

When Walter Treutzsch died in Leipzig on 23 September 1971, the party saw to it that a brief obituary notice appeared in the mass circulation newspaper Neues Deutschland, but he seems to have been quickly forgotten, both officially and otherwise. Some years later, however, in 1999, the influential historian-publisher Annette Leo published a biographical sketch on Walter Trautszch, and since then others have also revisited his remarkable, if tragic, life story.

== Family ==
A niece of Walter Trautzsch was Gisela Glende (1925-2016), the long-standing boss of the East German Politburo office, responsible for preparing agendas and draft decisions, and for producing the minutes of Poliburo meetings.
