= Arthur Franke =

German politician (1909–1992)

- Arthur Franke in 1988
- Born: 5 August 1909; Berlin, Germany
- Died: 23 October 1992 (aged 83); Rüdersdorf, Brandenburg Germany
- Occupation: Military Intelligence Chief (1959–1974)
- Political party: KPD; SED

Arthur Franke (5 August 1909 in Berlin – 23 October 1992 in Rüdersdorf) was a leading political policeman in East Germany; he became a military officer when the country's army was established in 1956. Three years later he became Chief of Military Intelligence of the National People's Army, ending up, in 1974, with the rank of Lieutenant general.

== Life ==
Arthur Franke was born into a working-class family, and on leaving school was apprenticed as a cabinet maker from 1923 till 1927, then working at the trade between 1927 and 1930. In 1930, he joined the Communist Party (KPD). He rose to become the treasurer, organiser and leader of a street cell. He was unemployed for the next three years, before getting a job in 1933/34 with Philipp Holzmann AG in Berlin.

In January 1933, the NSDAP (Nazi Party) seized power in Germany and quickly set about creating a one-party state. Membership of the Communist Party became illegal. Franke continued with illegal anti-fascist activities in Moabit (Berlin) until February 1934 when he moved to Czechoslovakia. He continued working for the German Communist party, smuggling imperiled German Communists across the border between the two countries. Disguising himself as a businessman, in January 1938 he then took a flight from Prague to Brussels. He managed to get to Spain via Paris, joining the International Brigades and taking part in the Spanish Civil War in 1938/39. In 1938 he was badly wounded in fighting outside Gandesa. Between 1939 and 1941 Franke was interned in France, spending time in concentration camps at St. Cyprien and Le Vernet. In April 1941 he was handed over to the Gestapo and sent back to Berlin where he was held on remand at Tegel Prison. He was then sentenced to 18 months in custody and returned to the same prison as before. However, in 1942 he was transferred to the concentration camp at Sachsenhausen, a short distance to the north of Berlin, and where he would remain till April/May 1945. As the Soviet army approached and national defeat loomed, plans were implemented to start emptying the Sachsenhausen concentration camp of its surviving internees, and in April 1945 Arthur Franke was one of a group of prisoners who set off on a Death march, during the course of which he managed to escape from his guards.

With the end of the war in May 1945 membership of the KPD was no longer illegal and Arthur Franke was (again) a member. In April 1946 the KPD (Communist party) in what was now becoming the German Democratic Republic (East Germany) merged with the SPD (party): members of both parties were invited, with a simple signature, to switch their party allegiance to the SED (party). In 1946 Arthur Franke joined the SED, becoming a member of the new party's district leadership team in the Tiergarten (Zoo) quarter of Berlin. Between 1945 and 1947 he was also the party's local Agitation and Propaganda secretary.

On 1 January 1949 he joined the "People's Police" ("Volkspolizei") as a commissioner and department head with the Criminal Police in Berlin's Police Headquarters. In 1950/51 he undertook a period of study at the Party's Karl Marx Academy in Berlin before being promoted, in 1951 as a Police Inspector (colonel level) and deputy head, as well as being leader of the Police airborne department and aero-club. Directly after the war there had been shared opposition to the idea of a German army among the allied occupying powers. Opinion shifted in the ensuing ten years, however, and when, in 1956, the German Democratic Republic was permitted to establish its own National People's Army, what emerged was partly based on quasi-military structures that had already been fashioned within the nation's police service.

When the national army (NVA / Nationale Volksarmee) was formally founded in 1956, Franke became a Deputy Head and Leader of the Political Department of the Air Force Commandos (LVA / Luftstreitkräfte der Nationalen Volksarmee), a position he retained till 10 February 1959. At the same time he was a member of The Party's regional leadership in Cottbus. There was another switch in February 1959 from when he served, initially as deputy Chief and then, from August 1959 through till November 1974 as the Chief of Military intelligence (Mil-ND / Militärnachrichtendienst) of the National People's Army. Franke's predecessor in this position, whose early retirement in 1959 came officially on health grounds, was Willy Sägebrecht whom he had already got to know on the Sachsenhausen Death march. During his fifteen years in charge of military intelligence Arthur Franke was promoted to the rank of Major general by Walter Ulbricht in 1966 and then to that of Lieutenant general by Erich Honecker in 1974.

He was released from military service on 31 January 1975, and in June 1975 he succeeded Helmut Wolff as President of the Sport and Technology Society Diving Club, an office he held till 1987.

During his final years he lived at Schöneiche on the eastern edge of Berlin.

== Awards and honours ==
- 1955 Patriotic Order of Merit in Bronze,
- 1959 Patriotic Order of Merit in Silver
- 1958 Medal for Fighters Against Fascism
- 1969 Banner of Labor
- 1974 Order of Karl Marx
- 1976 Ernst Schneller Medal in Gold
- 1977 Artur Becker Medal in Gold
- 1979 Patriotic Order of Merit in Gold
- 1982 Honorary Diploma of the Central Council of the FDJ
- Scharnhorst Order
