= Fritz Gäbler =

German politician (1897–1974)

Chairman of the Central Auditing Commission
- In office 6 April 1954 – 22 April 1967
- General Secretary: Walter Ulbricht
- Deputy: Sepp Hahn
- Preceded by: Alfred Oelßner
- Succeeded by: Kurt Seibt

Personal details
- Born: Fritz Gäbler; 12 February 1897 Meissen, Kingdom of Saxony, German Empire (now Saxony, Germany)
- Died: 26 March 1974 (aged 77) East Berlin, East Germany
- Party: Socialist Unity Party (1946–1974)
- Other political affiliations: Social Democratic Party (1914–1919); Communist Party of Germany (1919–1946)
- Occupation: Politician; Party Functionary; Journalist
- Awards: Patriotic Order of Merit, 1st class; Order of Karl Marx; Hero of Labour
- Central institution membership: 1954–1974: Member, Central Auditing Commission; Other offices held: 1946–1947: Chairman, Socialist Unity Party in Erfurt

Fritz Gäbler (12 January 1897 – 26 March 1974) was an East German communist politician. In 1932, he was a representative in the Thuringia state parliament. Gäbler was imprisoned for most of the Nazi era, having been one of the first prisoners in Nohra concentration camp. After the war, he became a member of the Socialist Unity Party of Germany, where he was chairman of the Central Auditing Commission. In 1987 he was commemorated by having a stamp designed with his face on it in East Germany.

== See also ==
- Kurt Seibt
