= Workers' and Peasants' Inspection of East Germany =

Control organ in East Germany

Workers' and Peasants' Inspection
- Arbeiter-und-Bauern-Inspektion
- National emblem of East Germany

Agency overview
- Formed: 14 May 1963
- Preceding agency: Central Commission for State Control (de facto)
- Dissolved: 4 January 1990
- Superseding agency: Committee for People's Control
- Jurisdiction: East Germany
- Headquarters: Clara-Zetkin-Strasse 93, East Berlin, East Germany
- Employees: 677 (1969)
- Agency executive: Albert Stief, Minister and Chairman
- Parent department: Central Committee of the SED; Council of Ministers of East Germany

The Workers' and Peasants' Inspection (German: Arbeiter-und-Bauern-Inspektion) (ABI) was a ministry-level control organ in East Germany jointly subordinate to the Central Committee of the Socialist Unity Party of Germany (SED) and the Council of Ministers. It was created as a part of Walter Ulbricht's New Economic System economic reforms.

Its purpose was to ensure the strict implementation of party decisions and laws, with particular emphasis on holding economic institutions accountable. Following the example of the Soviet People's Control Commission, the ABI relied heavily on a network of volunteers known as "people's inspectors", of which there were around 280,000 in 1988.

Though select controls were used in propaganda, the ABI's significance was small, especially after Erich Honecker came to power in 1971. Its controls were tightly constrained, among other things omitting political parties entirely, and it rarely made use of its disciplinary powers. It was abolished during the Peaceful Revolution.

== History ==
=== Inception ===
The Workers' and Peasants' Inspection was established on 14 May 1963 as part of Walter Ulbricht's New Economic System economic reforms by a decision of the Central Committee of the SED and a resolution of the Council of Ministers. It was accountable to both, the oversight on the Council of Ministers' side being the direct responsibility of its chairman.

Though not a legal successor, it supplanted the concurrently dissolved Central Commission for State Control (German: Zentrale Kommission für Staatliche Kontrolle) (ZKSK), which was a pure state organ, taking over part of its staff and structure. Its activities, like those of the preceding ZKSK, were based on the Soviet concept of joint control of economic and social developments by citizens and the government. More than the ZKSK, the ABI was intended to involve volunteers in its inspections. It closely resembled the Soviet People's Control Commission.

=== Honecker era ===
The failure of the New Economic System meant that the ABI also lost influence. Walter Ulbricht's successor Erich Honecker limited the scope of the ABI in August 1974. From then on, the ABI was only to ensure the fulfillment of the economic plan, by closely monitoring the implementation of SED decisions, adherence to production plans, the avoidance of bureaucratism and the improvement of organization and leadership.

=== Peaceful Revolution ===
During the Peaceful Revolution, the Presidium of the Volkskammer subordinated the Workers' and Peasants' Inspection to the Volkskammer and renamed it to "Committee for People's Control" (German: Komitee für Volkskontrolle) by resolution on 4 January 1990.

It was now supposed to provide non-partisan public controls, but it soon became apparent that the structures and tasks of the ABI had outlived their usefulness. Chairman Heinz Kittner proposed to convert the Committee to a Court of Audit, but this was rejected by Volkskammer President Sabine Bergmann-Pohl. The newly elected de Maizière government formally dissolved it in May 1990 and it was liquidated from June to December of that year. The ABI had already ceased its activities by the time of the Volkskammer elections in March.

== Work ==
The Workers' and Peasants' Inspection's task was to monitor the implementation of national economic and perspective plans as well as various economic policy goals, enforce "state discipline" and hold state and economic institutions and social organizations accountable; "sloppiness, mismanagement, waste, heartless behavior, local narrow-mindedness, whitewashing, the misuse of official positions and the squandering or misappropriation of public property" were to be uncovered.

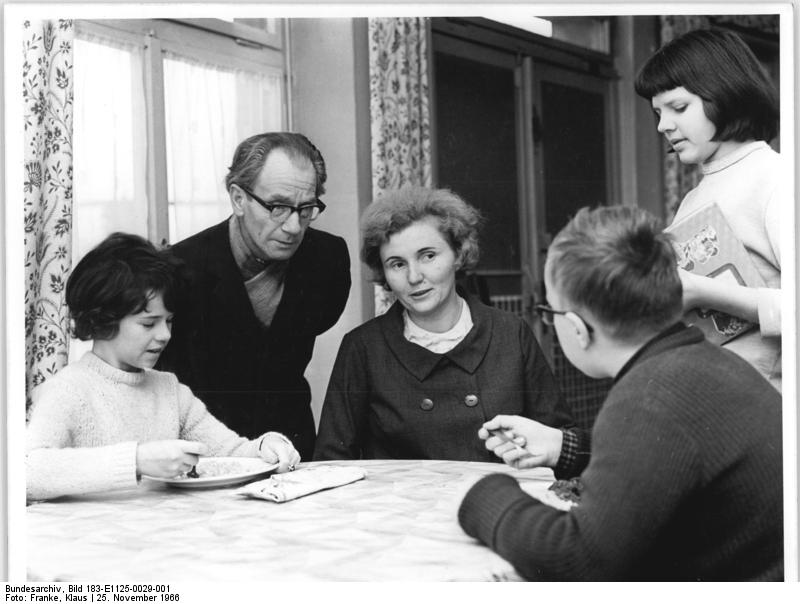
ABI members inspecting the quality of lunch in a Berlin school in November 1966

The system was built on, by 1988, around 280,000 volunteers, known as "people's inspectors" (German: Volkskontrolleure), who were employed in cooperatives, enterprises and combines, ministries and administrations. Volkskontrolleure did not have to be members of the SED. They monitored their colleagues, though only members of ABI committees were authorized to issue binding directives and impose disciplinary measures, so their actual influence was relatively limited. ABI committees furthermore rarely made use of disciplinary measures; in 1980, the ABI imposed 1,856 binding directives, but only 13 administrative penalties.

Nevertheless, newspapers often reported on the successes of the people's inspectors, especially in matters of supply shortages and poor service delivery and particularly serious cases were even analyzed on East German television, especially on the current affairs television programme Prisma. However, in total, only 15% of ABI controls were ever made public and emphasis was placed on propaganda value. Cases that could have pointed to wrong decisions and errors by the party and state leadership were not discussed, the blame often being put primarily on individuals.

Angered by negative reports by Prisma on the East German economy, Central Committee Secretary responsible for economics Günter Mittag forbade the ABI from giving access to their reports to Prisma in 1987, though they continued to receive them through other channels.

In addition, the leadership and boards of parties, mass organizations, certain ministries (especially the ministries of the so-called "armed organs" such as the Stasi), the public prosecutor's office and courts, as well as the press remained excluded from ABI controls.

== Structure ==
=== ABI committees ===
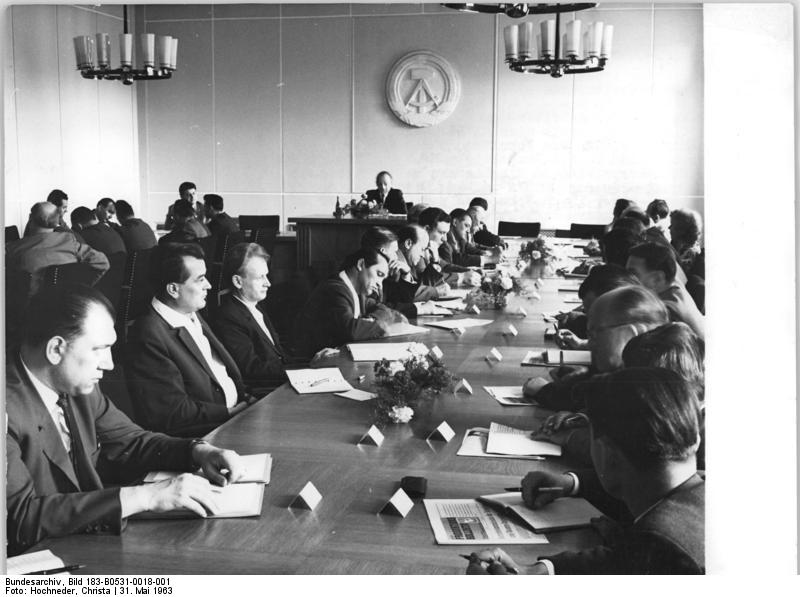
First meeting of the ABI Committee on 31 May 1963

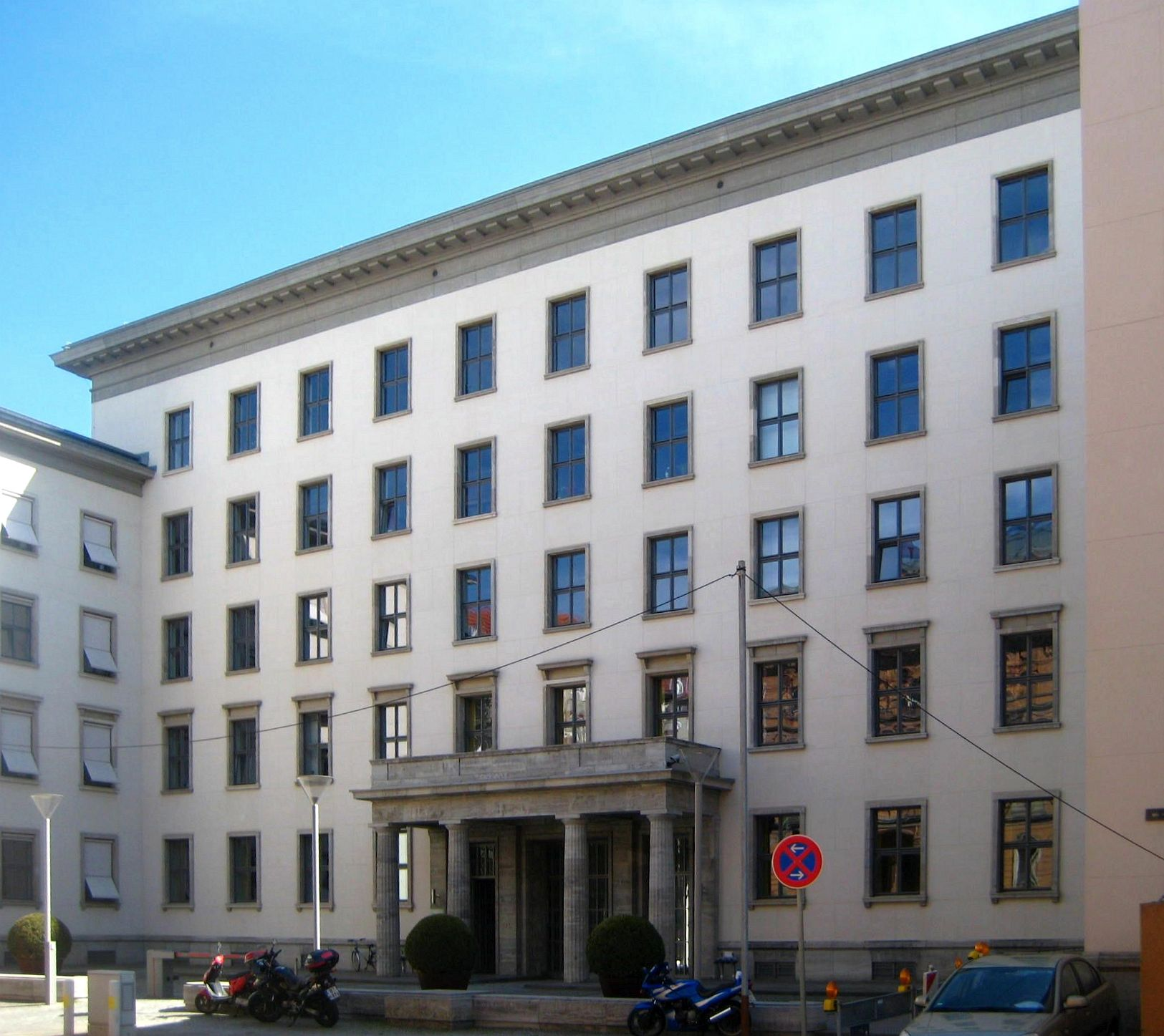
The former building of the ABI Committee, originally built as an extension to the Reich Ministry of the Interior, in 2010

The ABI was led by the ABI Committee (German: Komitee der Arbeiter- und Bauern-Inspektion), which first met on 31 May 1963 and initially had 26 members. The ABI Committee, analogously to the SED Central Committee, was supported by an apparatus with full-time employees that included different inspectorates for each sector of the East German economy. The ABI Committee was located in East Berlin, Clara-Zetkin-Strasse 93 (now Dorotheenstraße), in the same building that also housed the East German Ministry of Justice.

The Committee had similarly organized subordinate bodies in the East German ministries, Bezirke, districts, localities and industrial combines. Later, ABI committees were also set up in large agricultural cooperatives and at universities. In total, there were around 21,000 ABI committees by 1979. All of these were additionally subordinate to the corresponding SED party organizations.

The leading positions in the ABI Committee and in the Bezirk and district committees were filled exclusively with nomenklatura cadres selected by the Central Committee of the SED or the Bezirk SED leaderships. In 1969, the ABI staff included 677 full-time employees, all members of the SED, of which at least 143 worked in the ABI Committee apparatus. At this time, the ABI additionally had 119,000 volunteers. The number of volunteers grew to 180,000 in 1975, 200,000 in 1979, and as many as 280,000 in 1988.

=== Leadership ===
The ABI Committee was led by a chairman who held ministerial rank. The first chairman was Heinz Matthes, former economic secretary of the Bezirk Dresden SED. He retired for health reasons in late 1977 and was replaced by his state secretary Albert Stief, who served as chairman until resigning during the Peaceful Revolution "for health and age reasons". Both Matthes and Stief were full members of the SED Central Committee during their respective tenures.

Chairmen of the ABI Committee
Chairman	Tenure
Heinz Matthes	15 May 1963 – November 1977
Albert Stief	December 1977 – 22 November 1989
Heinz Kittner (acting)	22 November 1989 – 4 January 1990

The chairman was assisted by a state secretary (titled first deputy chairmen until 1969), namely Günter Sieber (1963–1965), Hans Albrecht (1965–1968), Werner Greiner-Petter (1968–1971), Albert Stief (1971–1977), Herbert Ebert (1977–1988), and Heinz Kittner (c. 1989). There were five additional deputy chairmen.

The Committee for People's Control was led by Heinz Kittner, former ABI state secretary, who also held ministerial rank. Kittner had already been the leading official of the ABI after Stief's resignation in November 1989, proposing changes to make the ABI more independent and announcing a new inspectorate investigating abuse of office charges.
