= People's Control Commission =

The People's Control was a semi-civic, semi-governmental organisation in the Soviet Union with the purpose of putting under scrutiny the activities of government, local administrations and enterprises. It traces its roots back to Rabkrin (the Workers' and Peasants' Inspectorate), established in 1920.

When Joseph Stalin rose to power, he merged Rabkrin with the CPSU Party Control Committee, only to un-merge them in the 1930s. Nikita Khrushchev, seeking to emulate the Bolsheviks but as part of his de-Stalinization efforts, merged them again and created the Committee of Party-State Control of the Central Committee of the CPSU and of the Council of Ministers of the USSR, putting the ambitious Alexander Shelepin in charge. In 1965, Leonid Brezhnev and the collective leadership around him separated them once more to restrain Shelepin's ambitions.

The 1979 USSR Law on People's Control established committees of people's control in each Soviet republic under the supervision of the central Committee of People's Control. These committees had the authority to audit government and economic administration records. Officials found guilty of illegalities could be publicly reprimanded, fined for damages, or referred to the procurator for prosecution. In the late 1980s, the committees of people's control were an invaluable instrument in Soviet general secretary Mikhail Gorbachev's efforts at reform and perestroika.

The committees of people's control extended throughout the Soviet Union. In 1989, of the more than 10 million citizens who served on these organs, 95 percent were volunteers. General meetings of work collectives at every enterprise and office elected the committees for tenures of two and one-half years. The chairman of the Committee of People's Control and a professional staff served for five years. The chairman sat on the USSR Council of Ministers.

== Chairmen ==
- Alexander Shelepin (...-1965)
- Pavel Kovanov
- Gennady Voronov (1971-)
- Alexey Shkolnikov (1974-)
- Sergey Manyakin (1987-)
- Gennady Kolbin (1989-)

== See also ==
- Central Auditing Commission
- Workers' and Peasants' Inspection of East Germany
