= Gisela Glende =

German politician (1925–2016)

Head of the Office of the Politburo
- In office 24 September 1968 – June 1986
- General Secretary: Walter Ulbricht; Erich Honecker
- Deputy: Tilo Fischer
- Preceded by: Otto Schön
- Succeeded by: Edwin Schwertner

Personal details
- Born: Gisela Trautzsch; 30 October 1925 Lengefeld, Free State of Saxony, Weimar Republic (now Germany)
- Died: 3 February 2016 (aged 90) Berlin, Germany
- Party: Socialist Unity Party (1946–1989)
- Other political affiliations: Communist Party of Germany (1945–1946)
- Spouse: Günter Glende (m. 1973; death 2004)
- Education: "Karl Marx" Party Academy (Dipl.-Ges.-Wiss.)
- Occupation: Politician; Party Functionary
- Awards: Patriotic Order of Merit, 1st class; Banner of Labor; Banner of Labor
- Central institution membership: 1986–1989: Full member, Central Auditing Commission; 1971–1986: Full member, Central Committee; Other offices held: 1951–1968: Deputy Head, Office of the Politburo

Gisela Glende (born Gisela Trautzsch: 30 October 1925 - 3 February 2016) was an East German party official. She served between 1968 and 1986 as head of the Office of the Politburo, which meant she was responsible for preparing the agendas and draft decisions, and for producing the minutes of Poliburo meetings.

== Biography ==
Gisela Trautzsch was born in Lengefeld, a small town at the heart of the mining region south of Chemnitz. As the niece of the Communist activist Walter Trautzsch, she grew up in a highly politicised working-class family. Her father was a metal worker. She attended school locally and then completed a "commercial" training at the vocational secondary school. After that she took a clerical job at the Kunstharzpresserei plant in Lengefeld.

War ended in May 1945. A large central portion of Germany, including her home region, was now administered as the Soviet occupation zone. Membership of the Communist Party was no longer illegal, and despite not yet being 21, Gisela Trautzsch joined it. In April 1946 a contentious political merger resulted (if only, for most purposes, within the Soviet occupation zone) in the formation of a new political party, the Socialist Unity Party ("Sozialistische Einheitspartei Deutschlands" / SED), and she was one of thousands of Communist Party members happy to sign their party membership across to a new united party of the left which many believed would ensure avoidance of a return to one-party dictatorship.

Between 1945 and 1948 Gisela Trautzsch was employed by the party leadership team for her local region of Marienberg ("KPD/SED -Kresileitung Marienberg") as a typist and as head of the personnel department. By 1948 she had also become secretary for Agitation and Propaganda with the Marienberg local party. During 1949/50 she undertook a study course (by correspondence course) with the Karl Marx Party Academy. That opened the way to a job in Berlin, where she was based by 1951. Later, between 1955 and 1960, she undertook a longer remote study course with the Karl Marx Party Academy which led to the award of a degree in Social Sciences in 1960.

Between 1951 and 1968 she was employed as a deputy head of the Politburo office. After the death of Otto Schön in September 1968, Gisela Glende succeeded him as head of the office. A few years later, in 1971, she herself became a member of the powerful Party Central Committee. She remained in post till September 1986 when she was degraded sideways and downwards in what was seen by commentators as an attempt by the leadership to try and rejuvenate the politburo and indeed the Central Committee more widely. Between 1986 and 1989 she served on the party's Central Auditing Commission.

== Personal ==
Gisela Trautzsch married Günter Glende (1918–2004) in 1973. She died in Berlin a few months after her ninetieth birthday.

== Awards and honours ==
- 1959 Patriotic Order of Merit in bronze
- 1969 Patriotic Order of Merit in silver
- 1969 Clara Zetkin Medal
- 1975 Patriotic Order of Merit in gold
- 1975 Battle Order "For Services to the People and the Fatherland"
- 1981 Banner of Labor
- 1984 Patriotic Order of Merit gold clasp
- 1985 Order of Karl Marx
- 1986 Order of Karl Marx
  (It is not clear whether this was a second announcement of the award she had received the previous year, or she was listed as a recipient in consecutive years, whether by design or through oversight.)
