= Karl Linke =

- Born: 10 January 1900; Görsdorf, Bohemia, Austro-Hungarian Empire
- Died: 16 May 1961 (aged 61); Zittau, Saxony, GDR (East Germany)
- Occupation: Military Intelligence Chief (1952–1957)
- Political party: USPD; KSČ; KPD; CPSU (КПСС); SED
- Children: Heinz Linke ca.1922 Galina Linke 1934

Karl Linke (born Görsdorf 10 January 1900: died Zittau 16 May 1961) was an officer in the East German army. Between 1952 and 1957 he was head of the country's Military Intelligence service.

Following the discovery of security breaches, on 31 August 1957 he was reduced in rank to reserve colonel.

== Life ==
=== Early years ===
Karl Linke was born in Görsdorf, then on the north-western frontier of Bohemia which was a quarter in the industrial town of Grottau, and part of the Austro-Hungarian Empire. At the time the town was bi-lingual, but following the creation in 1918 of Czechoslovakia the official language would become Czech in 1920. Linke came from a working-class family. He left school and undertook an apprenticeship in weaving in 1914, working as a weaver in a factory till 1918. Meanwhile, he joined the SAJ, which was effectively a youth branch of the Social Democratic party. In 1918, in the closing months of the war, he reached the age of 18 and joined the army. A brief period as an Italian prisoner of war ensued.

=== To Germany and then to Czechoslovakia ===
When the Italians released him his home town was in Czechoslovakia and Linke took a cleaning job in Senftenberg, across the frontier in Germany. It was here that in 1920 he joined the Independent Social Democratic Party of Germany (USPD / Unabhängige Sozialdemokratische Partei Deutschlands). In 1923 he recrossed the frontier into Czechoslovakia. Here, between 1923 and 1929, he worked as a weaver. He was, till 1930, a member of the Czechoslovak Communist Party, also working as a smuggler for the German Communist Party. While living in Czechoslovakia he played a leading role in a strike in 1927/28, and was later arrested for taking photographs without permission at the steel works in Witkowitz, possibly in connection with his work for the Berlin-based Arbeiter-Illustrierte-Zeitung (Workers Pictorial Newspaper).

=== To the Soviet Union ===
Linke was able to emigrate to the Soviet Union in 1930, accompanied by his second wife, whom he had married the previous year after the death of his first wife a few years earlier. He joined the Soviet Communist Party (КПСС), remaining a member till 1951. He worked in Moscow as a Master Weaver till 1934. After that, from 1935 till 1939, he worked in a clerical position in the Ministry for Light Industry. In 1939 he took a clerical job with the Chamber of Commerce in Moscow.

=== War ===
From the Soviet perspective the Great Patriotic War began in June 1941. In defiance of the existing non-aggression pact the German army invaded the Soviet Union. In July 1941 Karl Linke and his son Heinz both volunteered to join the Red Army, where one of Linke's roles was as a commissar in a partisan division, a role that for two years he combined with that of a (Communist) "Party Secretary" in the partisan group. In this capacity he took part in parachute operations behind German lines in the Gomel region. During 1944 as the leader of a reconnaissance group he took part in armed Slovak partisan operations and then in the Slovak National Uprising against the Axis government which erupted between August and October 1944. The war ended in the early summer of 1945 and Karl Linke returned to Moscow, suffering from wounds endured in the war and on account of the death of his son Heinz who had been killed while fighting with the Slovak partisans.

=== To Czechoslovakia and then to (East) Germany ===
In 1946 Karl Linke returned to Czechoslovakia, between 1946 and 1949 taking a middle management job in a tape weaving factory in Hrádek nad Nisou ("Grottau" in some older German sources). Fifteen years in the Soviet Union had left him with fluent Russian, and Linke then moved on, at the end of 1949, to Berlin where between 1950 and 1951 he worked as a simultaneous translator for the Soviet representative in the Allied Control Council. The German Democratic Republic (East Germany) had been formally founded (from what had previously been designated the Soviet occupation zone) in October 1949, and in 1951 Karl Linke and his wife both took East German citizenship.

In 1952 Karl Linke joined the Socialist Unity Party of Germany (SED / Sozialistische Einheitspartei Deutschlands) which since its controversial creation in April 1946 had become the ruling party, as part of a return to one-party government within this Soviet sponsored version of Germany. He then, till 1952, became a departmental director and head of the presidential secretariat with the State Planning Commission. On 1 June 1952 he joined the Kasernierte Volkspolizei, a quasi-military division of the East German Police Service which would later come to be seen as the precursor to the country's national army. He was promoted to the rank of major general within the service in October 1952. More importantly, between 1952 and 1957 he served as chief of the German Democratic Republic's "Verwaltung für Allgemeine Fragen und Aufklärung". English-language sources sometimes translate this as "Military Intelligence Service" although until 1956 East Germany was not permitted an army of its own. Linke enjoyed the full confidence of the country's Soviet sponsors and his time in charge saw early successes for the service which was well supported by the political establishment. There was a move from Pankow to new premises in central Berlin (Behrenstraße 42–45) and in 1956 a change of name to "Verwaltung 19" ("Administration [department] 19") apparently in order to conceal the true nature of the organisation.

By 1957 it was clear that regardless of its new name, "Verwaltung 19" under Karl Linke had been penetrated by western intelligence at a high level. Suspicion fell in particular on Siegfried Dombrowski who was placed under close counter-intelligence surveillance in February 1957, and who had entered the service, like Linke, via the Kasernierte Volkspolizei. The memoirs of Reinhard Gehlen, the West German intelligence chief would later confirm that from 1956 Dombrowski was indeed supplying intelligence both to West German Intelligence and to the American CIA, and in August 1958 Dombrowski fled to the west, although the extent of the information he provided remains unclear. Closer to home in July 1957 Karl Linke's housekeeper, Anna Kubiak, disappeared, accompanied by "sensitive documents", and leaving behind her a West German passport in his name and ten thousand Marks in cash for a "start in a better life". Linke's own household had been penetrated by the CIA's "Agent Martha".

On 30 August 1957 an army personnel chief reported that Karl Linke would be pensioned off at his own wish. He was reduced in rank to colonel. He was also given a ban on entering Berlin. He retired to Zittau, near to the frontier with Czechoslovakia, and it was here that he died on 16 May 1961.
