= Otto Schön =

German politician (1905–1968)

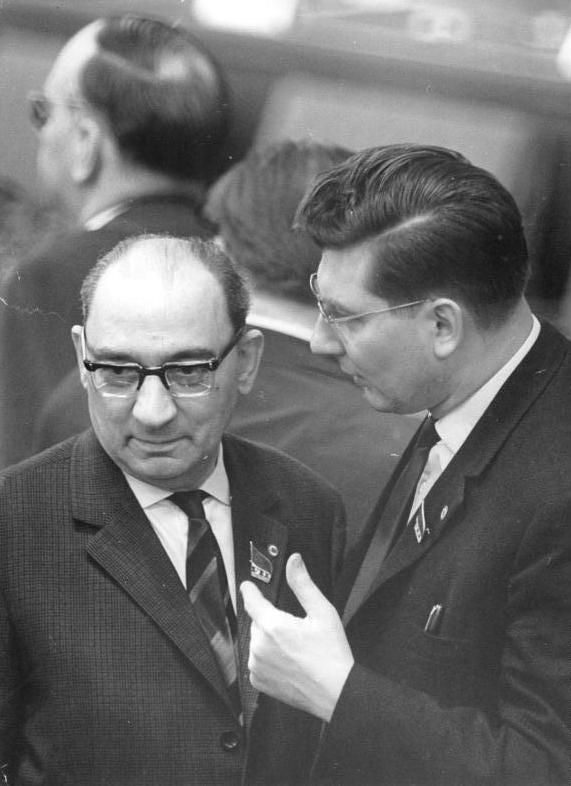
- Schön (left) in 1967

Head of the Office of the Politburo (Note: Office of the Central Secretariat until September 1953)
- In office 24 July 1950 – 15 September 1968
- First Secretary: Walter Ulbricht
- Deputy: Rudolf Thunig; Gisela Glende
- Preceded by: Rudolf Thunig
- Succeeded by: Gisela Glende

Secretary for Leading Organs of the Party and Mass Organizations of the Central Committee Secretariat (Note: Organization Instructor Department until 15 January 1952)
- In office 24 July 1950 – 26 July 1953
- First Secretary: Walter Ulbricht
- Preceded by: Paul Verner
- Succeeded by: Karl Schirdewan
Volkskammer
Member of the Volkskammer for Meißen, Riesa
In office 3 December 1958 – 15 September 1968
Preceded by	multi-member district
Succeeded by	Manfred Clauß

Personal details
- Born: Otto Ernst Schön; 9 August 1905 Königsberg, East Prussia, Kingdom of Prussia, German Empire (now Kaliningrad, Russia)
- Died: 15 September 1968 (aged 63) East Berlin, East Germany
- Resting place: Memorial of the Socialists, Friedrichsfelde Central Cemetery
- Party: Socialist Unity Party (1946–1968)
- Other political affiliations: Communist Party of Germany (1925–1946)
- Occupation: Politician; Party Functionary; Metal Worker
- Awards: Patriotic Order of Merit, 1st class; Medal for Fighters Against Fascism; Order of Karl Marx
- Central institution membership: 1950–1968: Full member, Central Committee; Other offices held: 1947–1950: Second Secretary, Socialist Unity Party in Saxony; 1946–1947: Chairman, Socialist Unity Party in Dresden

Otto Schön (9 August 1905 – 15 September 1968) was a German resistance fighter against National Socialism, politician and party functionary of the Communist Party of Germany (KPD) and Socialist Unity Party (SED).

Schön began his political career during the Weimar Republic as a regional party functionary of the KPD in Saxony. After the Nazis rose to power, he was arrested and detained in Nazi concentration camps until 1937. He served in the German resistance in Leipzig after a brief service in the Wehrmacht.

He rose through the ranks of the Socialist Unity Party in East Germany, eventually serving on the powerful Secretariat of the Central Committee as Secretary responsible for the Leading Organs of the Party and Mass Organizations Department. Though he lost that role after the 1953 uprising, he remained head of the powerful Office of the Politburo until his death in 1968.

== Life and career ==
=== Early career ===
The son of a farm laborer and a potter's apprentice, Schön attended primary school in Königsberg and secondary school in Berlin. From 1920 to 1923, he trained as an insurance and banking clerk and worked in this profession in Berlin until 1928.

Schön joined the Communist Party of Germany (KPD) and the Red Aid organization in 1925, having already been a member of the Young Communist League since 1922, during his apprenticeship. He started being a full time party functionary in the late 1920s, initially in Berlin-Kreuzberg, being transferred to the East Saxony party organization in 1928. There, he served as political leader of the Freital sub-district until 1930, after which he became a leading functionary of the Red Aid organization in Saxony.

=== Nazi Germany ===
Because of his involvement with the Red Aid organization, he was arrested in May 1933, shortly after the Nazi seizure of power. He was initially imprisoned in Bautzen Prison, a political prison for former SPD and KPD politicians. He was transferred to Sachsenburg concentration camp in 1936.

After his release in 1937, he worked as a metal laborer in Leipzig. He was drafted into the Wehrmacht in 1942, but was discharged the following year after being wounded.

From July 1943, he collaborated with the resistance group around Georg Schumann. Until 1945, he worked as a commercial clerk in Leipzig and was again active in illegal political activities.

=== Soviet occupation zone ===
After the war, he became secretary of the KPD in Leipzig. From 1946 to 1947, following the forced merger of the SPD and KPD, he was head of the SED in Dresden, also serving on its city council until 1950.

In 1947, he was promoted to Second Secretary of the Saxony SED state association.

=== SED Central Committee ===
Schön's largest career advancement came with the III. Party Congress of the SED in late July 1950. He was made a full member of the SED Central Committee and its powerful Secretariat. In the Secretariat of the Central Committee, he was responsible for the Organization Instructor Department, a department that became a lot more powerful after being merged with several others to form the Leading Organs of the Party and Mass Organizations Department.

Schön, however, had to step down during the reshuffling of offices following the June 1953 uprising. From 1950 until his death, he remained head of the powerful Office of the Politburo, becoming a close associate of Walter Ulbricht. From 1958, he additionally was a member of the Volkskammer, nominally representing a constituency in northwestern Bezirk Dresden.

=== Death ===
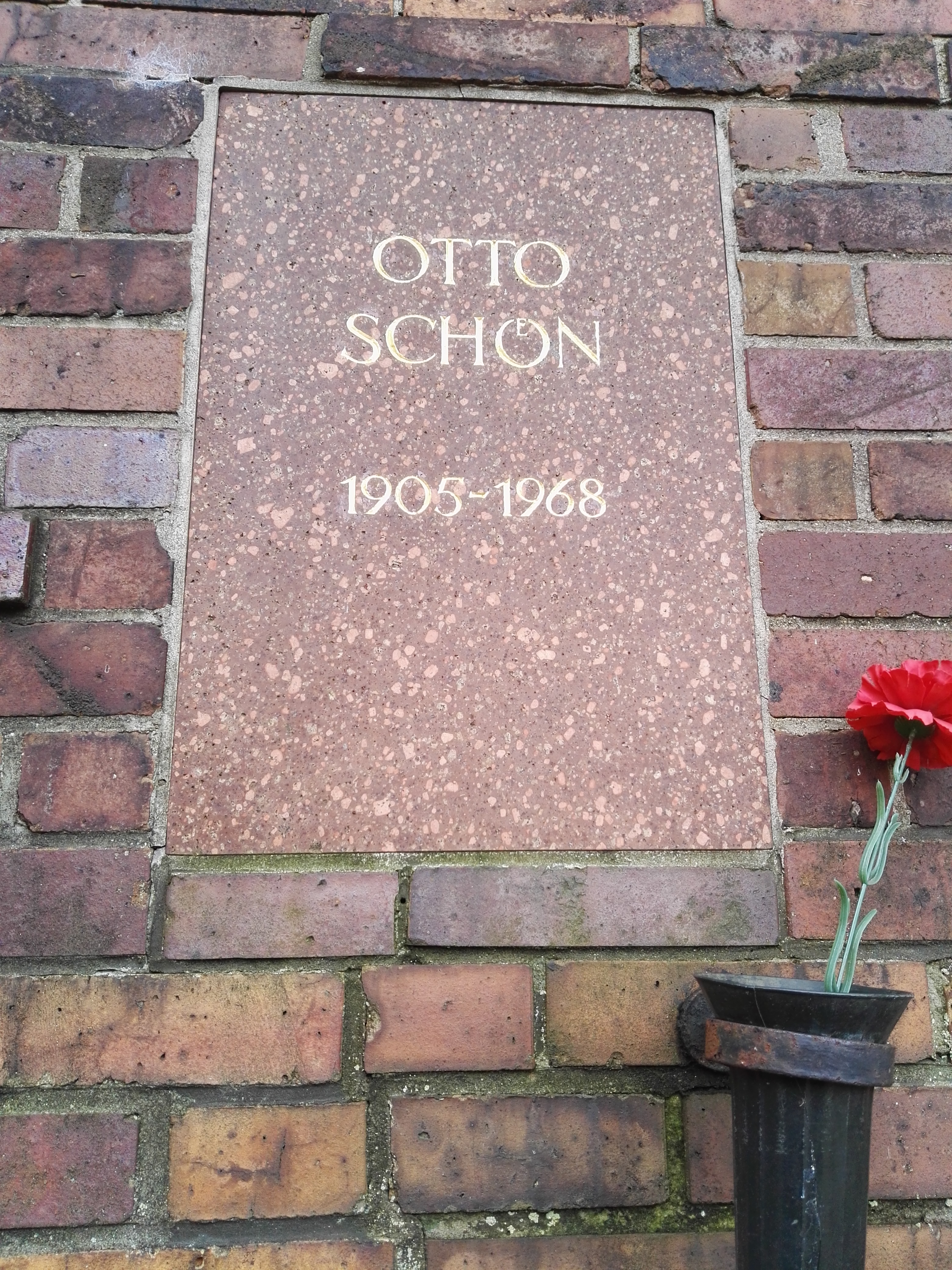
Schön's grave in 2016

Schön died in 1968 at the age of 63.

His urn was interred in the Memorial of the Socialists at the Friedrichsfelde Central Cemetery in Berlin-Lichtenberg.
