= Liebenwalde =

- Town
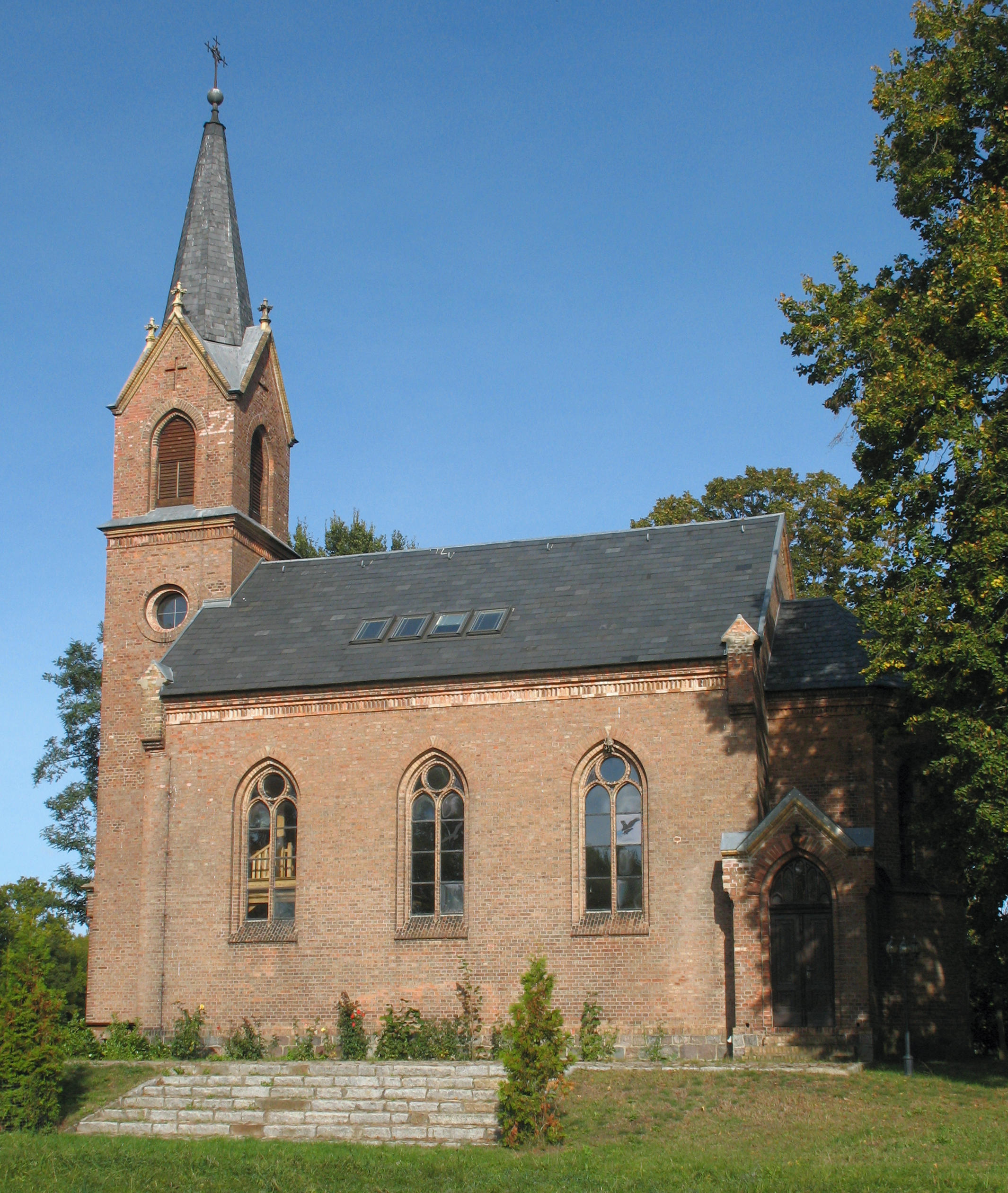
- Kreuzbruch church

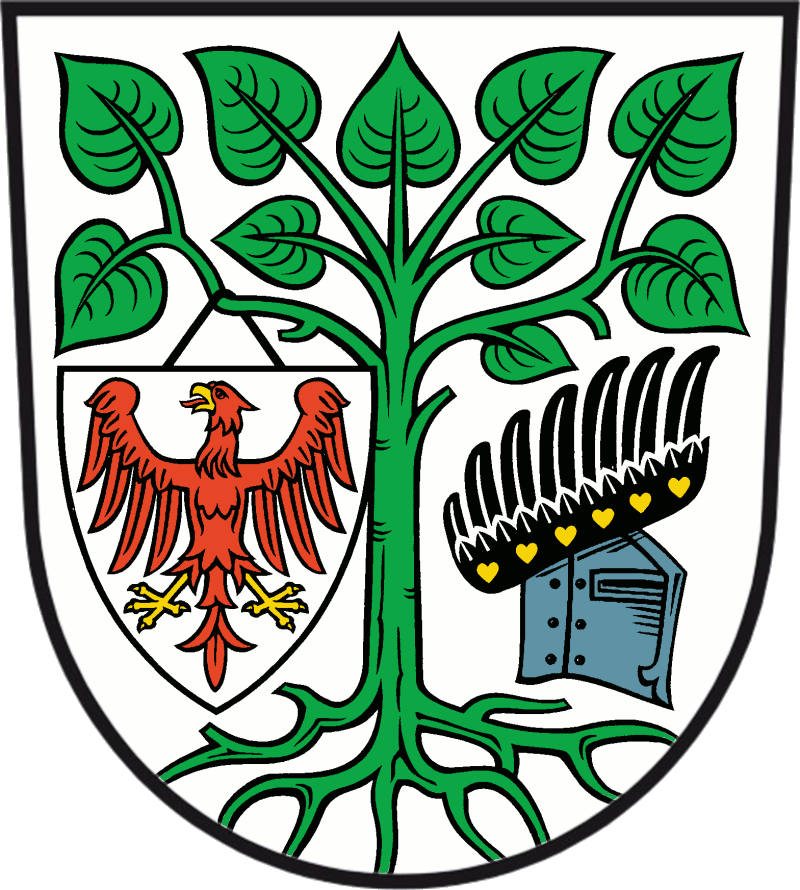
- Coat of arms

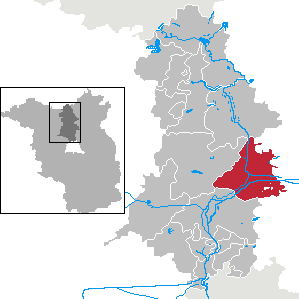
- Location of Liebenwalde within Oberhavel district
- Interactive map of Liebenwalde
- Location within Germany Location within Brandenburg
- Coordinates: 52°52′N 13°24′E
- Country: Germany
- State: Brandenburg
- District: Oberhavel
- Subdivisions: 6 districts

Government
  - Mayor (2019–27): Jörn Lehmann

Area
  - Total: 142.17 km^{2} (54.89 sq mi)
- Elevation: 41 m (135 ft)

Population (2025-12-31)
  - Total: 4,419
  - Density: 31.08/km^{2} (80.50/sq mi)
- Time zone: UTC+01:00 (CET)
  - Summer (DST): UTC+02:00 (CEST)
- Postal codes: 16559
- Dialling codes: 033054
- Vehicle registration: OHV
- Website: www.liebenwalde.de

Liebenwalde (German pronunciation: [ˌliːbn̩ˈvaldə]) is a town in the Oberhavel district, in Brandenburg, in north-eastern Germany. It is situated 16 km (10 mi) northeast of Oranienburg, and 39 km (24 mi) north of Berlin (centre).

== History ==
In 1319, the town was captured by Henry II, Lord of Mecklenburg, then in mid-1320 it was captured by Wartislaw IV, Duke of Pomerania, and recaptured by Henry II by the end of 1320. Afterwards it passed to the Margraviate of Brandenburg, and from 1373 to 1415 it was part of the Lands of the Bohemian (Czech) Crown.

In 2003, the administrative boundaries were expanded to include Freienhagen, Hammer, Kreuzbruch, Liebenthal and Neuholland.

== Demography ==
Development of Population since 1875 within the Current Boundaries (Blue Line: Population; Dotted Line: Comparison to Population Development of Brandenburg state; Grey Background: Time of Nazi rule; Red Background: Time of Communist rule)

Recent Population Development and Projections (Population Development before Census 2011 (blue line); Recent Population Development according to the Census in Germany in 2011 (blue bordered line); Official projections for 2005-2030 (yellow line); for 2020-2030 (green line); for 2017-2030 (scarlet line)

Liebenwalde: Population development
within the current boundaries (2020)

Year	Pop.	±% p.a.
1875	4,152	—
1890	4,806	+0.98%
1910	5,314	+0.50%
1925	4,659	−0.87%
1933	4,937	+0.73%
1939	5,236	+0.98%
1946	6,716	+3.62%
1950	6,797	+0.30%
1964	6,089	−0.78%
1971	5,848	−0.58%
1981	5,354	−0.88%
1985	5,189	−0.78%
1989	5,134	−0.27%
1990	4,997	−2.67%
1991	4,883	−2.28%

Year	Pop.	±% p.a.
1992	4,814	−1.41%
1993	4,719	−1.97%
1994	4,709	−0.21%
1995	4,741	+0.68%
1996	4,736	−0.11%
1997	4,693	−0.91%
1998	4,686	−0.15%
1999	4,670	−0.34%
2000	4,670	+0.00%
2001	4,692	+0.47%
2002	4,672	−0.43%
2003	4,661	−0.24%
2004	4,608	−1.14%
2005	4,582	−0.56%
2006	4,548	−0.74%

Year	Pop.	±% p.a.
2007	4,497	−1.12%
2008	4,458	−0.87%
2009	4,390	−1.53%
2010	4,334	−1.28%
2011	4,275	−1.36%
2012	4,229	−1.08%
2013	4,191	−0.90%
2014	4,198	+0.17%
2015	4,261	+1.50%
2016	4,277	+0.38%
2017	4,284	+0.16%
2018	4,296	+0.28%
2019	4,309	+0.30%
2020	4,368	+1.37%
