= Bruno Mahlow =

German politician (1937–2023)

Head of the International Relations Department of the Central Committee
- In office 8 November 1989 – 3 December 1989
- Secretary: Günter Sieber
- Preceded by: Günter Sieber
- Succeeded by: Position abolished

Personal details
- Born: 27 June 1937 Moscow, Russian SFSR, Soviet Union
- Died: 22 February 2023 (aged 85) Berlin, Germany
- Party: The Left (2007–2023)
- Other political affiliations: Party of Democratic Socialism (1989–2007); Socialist Unity Party (1957–1989)
- Parent: Bruno Mahlow Sr. (father)
- Education: Institute of International Relations (Dipl.-Ges.-Wiss.)
- Occupation: Politician; Party Functionary; Diplomat
- Awards: Patriotic Order of Merit, 1st class

Bruno Brunowitsch Mahlow (27 June 1937 – 22 February 2023) was a German politician (SED/PDS/Die Linke) and an East German diplomat.

== Biography ==
Bruno Mahlow was born in Moscow, Soviet Union on 27 June 1937. His eponymous father (Bruno Mahlow 1899–1964) had been a founder member of the German Communist Party back in 1918, and after fifteen years as a party activist had emigrated from his Berlin home, via Prague, to Moscow two months after the Hitler government took power at the start of 1933, which is how Bruno Brunowitsch Mahlow came to be born in Moscow. By this time the elder Bruno Mahlow was a semi-invalid, having damaged his spine in a fall while escaping through Czechoslovakia. In 1937 the father was caught up in one of Stalin's purges and arrested, but the next year, gravely ill, he was released. In August 1941, like many Germans in Moscow at the time of the German invasion the family were banished from Moscow, initially to Astrakhan and from there, the next month, further east to Tashkent (then in the Uzbek SSR). It was in Tashkent that in 1944 Mahlow started his schooling. The Mahlows remained there until May 1947 when, following the end of the war, they were able to return to east Berlin in the Soviet occupation zone in what remained of Germany.

Mahlow attended secondary school in Germany and then the Worker and Farmer College in Halle, from where, aged nearly 18, he graduated in 1955. By now, the German Democratic Republic (East Germany), founded in October 1949, had replaced the Soviet military administration in this part of Germany, although the Group of Soviet Forces in Germany remained in the country. Between 1955 and 1961, Bruno Mahlow was a student at the Moscow State Institute of International Relations (MGIMO). Back in the German Democratic Republic the controversial creation of Socialist Unity Party of Germany (SED), in April 1946, more than three years before the state was formally established, had provided a firm foundation for a return to one-party government within this part of Germany: in 1957 Bruno Mahlow joined East Germany's ruling SED (party).

On concluding his studies, Mahlow joined the diplomatic service of the German Democratic Republic. Between 1962 and 1964, he was employed by the Foreign Ministry before being sent to Peking, where he served as First Secretary in the East German embassy between 1964 and 1967.

From 1967 he was employed by the Party Central Committee, becoming a deputy departmental head in August 1973 and then, during the defining months of November and December 1989, as Head of the Central Committee's Department for International Relations in succession to Günter Sieber. Personal contacts were important in Mahlow's career. As a child growing up in the Soviet Union his family had known fellow exile Wilhelm Pieck, who in 1949 had become the president of the German Democratic Republic. Mahlow's Soviet childhood had made him bilingual, and during the 1980s he sometimes worked as a simultaneous translator for East German leader Erich Honnecker in meetings with Soviet leader Leonid Brezhnev. Towards the end of his time in office Brezhnev suffered a stroke, after which his meetings with foreign leaders such as Honecker included the Soviet Foreign Minister Defence Minister and KGB Chief. During a period when there was more friction in the relationship between the Soviet Union and the German Democratic Republic than was always apparent from a western perspective, this often left Mahlow and Honnecker as the only Germans in meetings with the Soviet Union's four most powerful leaders and their translators. Bruno Mahlow's previous work at the East German embassy in Peking also made him a top government "China expert", and during a period when Sino-US rapprochement was causing unhappiness in Moscow, Mahlow found himself on the diplomatic front-line in respect of tensions between Moscow and East Berlin over East Germany's own relations with China, which were driven more by commercial opportunities and less by the geo-political considerations that were important for Soviet strategists.

In May 1976 Bruno Mahlow's own name was placed on the candidates' list for membership of the Party Central Committee, and in April 1981 he became one of the 156 members of the Central Committee He was also, between 1981 and 1989, head of the Foreign Policy Commission of the Central Committee Politburo, taking over the post from Egon Winkelmann who had been appointed the East German ambassador to Moscow. In 1990, during the run-up to German reunification, Mahlow served as a consultant to the International Affairs Commission of the Party of Democratic Socialism (PDS), which took the place of the old East German SED party at this time.

Bruno Mahlow was a member of the central committee of the Society for German–Soviet Friendship between 1974 and 1989. Between 1985 and 1989 Mahlow also served as deputy president of the Society for German–Chinese Friendship.

Although Mahlow did not feature prominently in public life after 1990, he remained (in 2013) a member of the Elders' Council of "Die Linke", the German political party that has inherited its mantle and at least some of its attitudes from the East German SED party.

Mahlow died in Berlin on 22 February 2023, at the age of 85.

== Awards and honours ==
- 1974: Patriotic Order of Merit in Bronze
- 1976: Patriotic Order of Merit in Silver
- 1987: Patriotic Order of Merit in Gold

== Published output ==
=== Books ===
- Bruno Mahlow: Wir stehen in der Geschichte und damit in der Verantwortung. Texte 2004 bis 2012. edition ost, Berlin 2012, ISBN 978-3-89793-285-2
- (wissenschaftliche Gesamtredaktion): Internationale Arbeiterbewegung und revolutionärer Kampf in der Gegenwart. Dietz, Berlin 1973.
- (Leitung des Autorenkollektivs): Kommunistische Bewegung und revolutionärer Kampf. Dietz, Berlin 1979.
- (with Götz Dieckmann): Einführung in Lenins Schrift „Zwei Taktiken der Sozialdemokratie in der demokratischen Revolution“ . Dietz, Berlin 1980 (5th edition, 1989).
- (with Harald Neubert): Die Kommunisten und ihr Zusammenwirken. Dietz, Berlin 1983.

=== Articles ===
- Lenin über die richtige Verbindung von Nationalem und Internationalem in der Politik der kommunistischen Parteien I/II. In: Einheit, (1970) Vol 4, p. 472ff. and Vol 5, p. 662ff.
- Arbeiterklasse gegen Monopolkapital. In: Einheit, (1971), Vol 9, p. 1007–1016.
- Die Verantwortung der Kommunisten für die Sicherheit in Europa. Wandel vom Kalten Krieg zur Entspannung. In: Militärwesen (1974), Vol 9, p. 11–18.
- Die Kommunisten – entschiedenste Kraft in den Kämpfen unserer Zeit. In: Einheit, Jg. 40 (1985), Vol 3, p. 251–257.
- Höchstes Gebot: Dauerhafte Wende zur Entspannung. In: Horizont, (1987), Vol 11, p. 3–5.
- Auf sozialistischem Wege. Zum 40. Jahrestag der Gründung der Volksrepublik China. In: Einheit, (1989), Vol 9/10, p. 947–952.
- Die EU-Osterweiterung: Probleme und Chancen? (Referat auf dem Friedensratschlag Dezember 2003). Auf der Seite der AG Friedensforschung an der Universität Kassel.
- EU-Russland: „Risse im gemeinsamen Haus“ (Referat auf dem Friedensratschlag Dezember 2004). Auf der Seite der AG Friedensforschung an der Universität Kassel.
