= Siegfried Dombrowski =

East German army officer

Siegfried Dombrowski (13 October 1916 - 20 June 1977) was an East German army officer who rose to the rank of "Oberstleutnant" (loosely, "Lieutenant colonel"). He combined this with his role as deputy chief-of-staff of Intelligence Administration of the East German military intelligence agency. On 5 August 1958, accompanied by his wife and children, along with a substantial sum of cash, he escaped to West Berlin. For the western intelligence services he subsequently turned out to be a highly valuable source of information about the organisational structures under which their eastern counterparts operated.

== Life ==
=== Provenance and early years ===
Siegfried Dombrowski was born at the height of the First World War. His father worked as a delivery driver. According to the account he later gave of himself (disputed by his brother) he was a member of a Communist youth organisation from an early age. During the twelve Hitler years he spent time as an inmate of various concentration camps and other places of detention, ending up at the infamous Majdanek camp near Lublin, which had been under German occupation since 1939. He was freed when what remained of the camp was liberated by Soviet forces towards the end of July 1944. Between 1946 and 1950 he worked as a party official for the newly formed Socialist Unity Party ("Sozialistische Einheitspartei Deutschlands" / SED) in the Soviet occupation zone (relaunched in October 1949 as the Soviet-sponsored German Democratic Republic). In 1950 he joined the "Kasernierte Volkspolizei", the quasi-military police service which at this point was the closest thing to an army that was acceptable in any part of Germany to the governments of the Soviet Union and the United States. Following the creation, in 1956, of the National People's Army he was one of many who switched into it, having already undertaken several military training courses. Within the army, he apparently joined as a senior member of the still embryonic military Intelligence Administration. The East German Ministry for State Security ("Stasi") warned Karl Linke, head of Military Intelligence (Verwaltung für Allgemeine Fragen), about Dombrowski's contacts in West Berlin, but it is unclear how detailed the warning s were, and they went unheeded.

=== Under suspicion ===
Starting in February 1957, Dombrowski was placed under surveillance by the Homeland Security counterintelligence service, after they had noticed how often he had been using his position to defy the ban on travel to West Berlin (and, indeed, to West Germany) which covered Kasernierte Volkspolizei members. That was also the reason that Homeland Security placed a block on his appointment as operations head of "Verwaltung-19" section of the military intelligence. The block was simply ignored by the Ministry for Defence, which is what triggered the targeted surveillance operation initiated on the home front on 14 February 1957. The surveillance operation, identified internally as "Operation Nebelkrähe" ("Operation hooded crow") was headed up by a senior Stasi officer called Friedrich Busch, whose special area of expertise was military intelligence. The immediate objective was to identify the people with whom Dombrowski was associating. The nature of the assignment was relatively routine, but the findings were less so. It was established that Dombrowski had been listed as an informant by foreign intelligence services since October 1951 under the code name "Rebell", but it was also established that "Rebell" had evidently not been "active" in this role. Enquiries were also made of Dombrowski's friends and relations concerning time in the Soviet Union during 1945, following his liberation from a Concentration Camp. Discrepancies were identified between the "official" version held in the files by the Kasernierte Volkspolizei and the versions subsequently provided by his contacts, leaving it unclear whether he had attended a Communist Party College near Moscow, or had used the time to recuperate at Zaporizhia. Then investigators then undertook further "in depth enquiries" of Dombrowski's neighbours and relatives. The suspicions of Homeland Security increased further when another senior intelligence officer, Alexander Karin, reported to intelligence chief Karl Linke that Dombrowski's wife had been talking to Karin's wife about a highly secret intelligence-related intervention. Linke himself was sworn to secrecy over the affair because, the men from Homeland Security explained, "we have recorded activities involving Dombrowski that are still unexplained".

While the Dombrowski family were away on holiday their apartment was thoroughly searched, and further discrete enquiries were made of their neighbours and other contacts. Employees at a language school in Chemnitz reported that Dombrowski had promised them well-aid job in a decryption office near Bernau (just outside Berlin). It was also reported that he had disclosed the true nature of a college for intelligence agents to the head of an "Engineers' Regiment" ("Pionierregiment"). Busch also pursued his enquiries with the wife of Alexander Karin, who came up with more testimony concerning the loose tongue of Dombrowski's wife, who was said to have shared items of supposedly secret information concerning the increasingly sophisticated "Inner German border" defences. In response, at the end of 1957 Homeland Security, having concluded that Dombrowski was unreliable, dishonest and unnecessarily talkative, set in place an operational plan to end the matter. His letters - sent and received - were subjected to intensified scrutiny and secret investigations were extended to relatives and other acquaintances in Selchow, Mahlow, Kolberg and Radegast. Dombrowski's fellow concentration camp inmates were located and questioned, and his official driver was recruited as an informant. Intriguingly, the security services remained confident that their target would remain blissfully unaware of their investigations, but it is clear that by July or August 1958 at the latest, Dombrowski sensed that the Homeland Security was closing in on him.

Available sources remain imprecise on many of the details of Dombrowski's espionage activities against the German Democratic Republic during the 1950s. It is nevertheless apparent from Reinhard Gehlen's own memoires that Dombrowski was an active agent on behalf of the so-called "Gehlen Organization" (West German intelligence) from 1956. Subsequently, declassified CIA information confirms Gehlen's disclosure, along with the involvement of the agency in Dombrowski's handling, while resolutely refuting Gehlen's assertion that Dombrowski was "recruited by the CIA". (The unnamed CIA reviewer of Gehlen's book insists that Dombrowski "was a walk-in to [the] CIA".)

=== Flight to West Berlin ===
On 28 July 1958 Dombrowski asked the relevant duty officer for some keys and casually enquired when the security guards ended their shift. The enquiry from the departmental deputy chief-of-staff of Intelligence Administration evidently triggered no suspicion. On 2 August 1958 Dombrowski a had himself a duplicate set of keys created for the safe containing "operational cash". He then took approximately 71,000 West German Marks from the safe.

On the night of 5/6 August 1958 Siegfried Dombrowski crossed into West Berlin, accompanied by his wife and sons. He identified himself to US Military Intelligence officers, who may have been expecting him. From an East German perspective he disappeared. He was taken to a US facility at Oberursel in West Germany for a period of questioning that lasted for several weeks. He was then flown to the United States where he was questioned at length by the CIA at Langley, Virginia. He had no secret papers with him, but had carried in his head a large amount of valuable operational information about East German military intelligence, and this he shared.

On 22 January 1959 Dombrowski surfaced unexpectedly at a press conference in Bonn. Representatives of "Berlin Operating Base" distributed handbills to the assembled journalists, providing a briefing on the Dombrowski story. The context for the Bonn press conference was a demand issued on 27 November 1958 by Soviet First Secretary Nikita Khrushchev for the rapid demilitarisation of West Berlin and its conversion into a "free city". Khrushchev had at the same time accused the United States and her allies of abusively turning West Berlin into a "swamp of spies". Producing Dombrowski at the press conference was part of a public relations counter-blast from the western side, intended to demonstrate that the true nest of Spies was East Berlin, operating under the direction of East Germany and her Soviet allies. The journalists were also provided with a 153-page memorandum entitled "Östliche Untergrundarbeit gegen Westberlin" ("Eastern Underground Work against West Berlin") that had been compiled, it was said, by Berlin's Senator for Interior Affairs. A little later a collection of documents appeared in a bulky volume published under the direction of the West German Intelligence Service under the title "Ost-Berlin, Agitations- und Zersetzungszentrale für den Angriff gegen den Bestand und die verfassungsmäßige Ordnung der Bundesrepublik Deutschland und Operationsbasis der östlichen Spionagedienste", which backed up the western allegations of multiple misfeasances by the eastern intelligence services against West Germany, using Est Berlin as a base. The volume reported various statements attributed to Dombrowski, in support of the western case that East Berlin was a hotbed of Soviet and East German spies, and his statements were enriched with additions inserted by Anna Kubiak, a remarkable CIA agent and information specialist identified by her handlers as "Agent Martha", who till shortly before the press conference had herself been working undetected as a western spy at the heart of the East German intelligence apparatus in East Berlin.

That same day B.Z., a West Berlin daily newspaper (not always associated with such serious news items) carried on its front page the headline "Nach West-Berlin übergelaufen, Spionagechef der Zonen-Armee": Dombrowski's defection to the west was no longer a secret. The termination of the career of Karl Linke as head of the East German Military Intelligence (Verwaltung für Allgemeine Fragen) service was reported at the same time, though in fact Linke had been removed from his intelligence post back in the summer of 1957.

=== Investigations in East Germany ===
After his appearance at the press conference, Dombrowski disappeared again. The next time he resurfaced he would be accompanied by his family, and with a new identity.

Meanwhile, based on the investigations that had been in place by August 1958, the security services already had a clear picture of the sort of information that he could have taken with him to the west. He had an intimate knowledge of the internal workings of "Verwaltung 19", insofar as they did not touch directly on the dispersed regional operations of Homeland security. Friedrich Busch, the man in charge of the investigations, came to the conclusion that Dombrowski's knowledge of the personnel policies of East German Intelligence, the telephone connections and the entire service network were likely to be more extensive than in intelligence chiefs had been assuming, and he therefore recommended a broad package of additional security measures. At the same time - presumably for largely symbolic reasons - "Verwaltung 19" was renamed "Verwaltung 12". Individuals' identities and telephone numbers were changed and regional offices in Schwerin, Magdeburg, Erfurt and Leipzig were relocated. It was only at this point that the security services became aware that the wall separating Dombrowski's office from that of the spy chief Erich Rippberger had been so thin that Dombrowski could have heard through it every word spoken. A further layer in the security controls system arose because Rippenberger was a trusting soul who disliked "conspiratorialism", and he was in the habit of identifying target sources in the western intelligence community not by their assigned code names but by their actual names. On 8 August 1958 Rippenberger was himself interrogated in a session that lasted for more than twelve hours. He received a severe reprimand, and was presumably redeployed to less sensitive responsibilities. Rippenberger's telephone line was subjected, from now on, to intensified surveillance procedures. Meanwhile, the conclusion of "Operation hooded crow" was that Dombrowski "knew too much".

On one point the investigation completely cleared Dombrowski even in 1959. Nothing had been found to back up suspicions of "collusion with a foreign power".

=== East German Security attempts to eliminate Dombrowski ===
During the second half of 1958 work began in trying to establish Dombrowski's whereabouts in order to put surveillance. He was believed to have been resettled in West Germany where the East German security services had a useful potential lead in the form of their target's nephew, who had been living in West Germany since 1955 and was already one of the agency's many registered informants. Within the service, the nephew was identified as "IM Hans". Once Dombrowski's whereabout had been pinpointed, the next move would be to work out ways in which he might be either kidnapped, and taken back to East Germany, or else killed. There were to be several kidnapping and murder attempts, but these were not successful.

Towards the end of October 1958 the security services established that Dombrowski was living in Moers, an industrial town a short distance down-river from Düsseldorf on the north-western side of Germany. The discovery was made by tracking a postcard sent to Kurt Dombrowski, the target's brother, and plans were put in place that would involve both the brother and another operative, who were sent to Moers to try and find out more details about the circumstances under which Siegfried Dombrowski was living. The longer-term objective remained, as before, either to capture Dombrowski and spirit him back to East Germany, or else to "liquidate" him in Moers. The "liquidation" option was only acceptable if the deed could be performed in a manner that5 would ensure press coverage. The East German intelligence services had been humiliated by what was known of Dombrowski's espionage career, so there could be no question of the perpetrator's nemesis going unnoticed. Another existing Stasi informant, "IM Wald" was now brought into the picture. This was Richard Busch from Stralsund, a brother of Siegfried's wife Gerda Dombrowski. By this time, thanks to the slaughter of war and the emigration of several million East Germans to the west during the decade that had followed it, there was a desperate shortage of working-age citizens in East Germany and it had become impossible, under almost all circumstances, for East Germans, to obtain permission to travel abroad. An exception was now made for Richard Busch, however. He was sent for a holiday break in Moers. Busch may have enjoyed his holiday on the west, but in terms of the security service goals of capturing or killing Siegfried Dombrowski, nothing came of the plan.

=== Dombrowski and the CIA ===
Although East German agents in West Germany were unable to retrieve Dombrowski, his information was evidently still being used by US intelligence. An East German Oberleutnant Poppig received a letter by courier from the west hinting strongly that if he would defect to the west, he would be provided with necessary medications for his sick son. Poppig reported the offer to his senior commander, and the letter was passed over to the security services. Another letter, more threatening in tone than the one received by Poppig, was received by Cadre chief Oberstleutnant Schicht another of Dombrowski's former professional comrades in the Intelligence Service, the next year. Schicht had by this time been retired, and was only a reserve officer, but it was believed that Dombrowski would have been unaware of this. The letter sent to Schicht also ended up with the security services, who nevertheless remained concerned over just how many unreported letters inviting defection to the west might have been sent to former colleagues of Dombrowski, who would have known the weak points of many individual members of East German intelligence.

=== The neighbour ===
There was a further development at the end of 1959 when HVA II/4, a department of the East German state security agency, the Staatssicherheitsdienst (commonly called the Stasi), the that focused on "abroad", (Note: Although the HVA was notionally concerned with foreign countries in general, in practice its focus was almost exclusively on West Germany where the fact of a shared language gave the East Germans a huge practical advantage over their Soviet counterparts. Beyond West Germany, however, intelligence activity on behalf of the Soviet Union and its central European allies tended to be tightly controlled directly from Moscow.) located a former neighbour and friend of the Dombrowskis. The friendship dated back to 1953: according the HVA agent "Lenz" in West Berlin, the friends had remained in touch after the Dombrowskis' defection to the west. The friend, when questioned, admitted to having received several letters from Gerda Dombrowski over the years, and also provided the new information that - probably during the middle part of 1959 - the Dombrowskis had spent six months in the United States, but were now back in West Germany, and looking for a new apartment. The envelope in which the letter was received came with a postmark from Gmund am Tegernsee, a remote municipality in the northern Alpine foothills south-east of Munich. The name of the sender was given on the back of the envelope as "Dürnbach". Two further letters, received in April and June 1960, also came with a Gmund am Tegernsee postmark, but now the sender's name was given as "Hirsch". The East Germans now sent an agent with the cover name "Hausmann" to take a look at Gmund and try and find out more. "Hausmann" sent back some still photographs and a section of cine film that enabled the service to identify the Dombrowskis positively. He also reported that Dombrowski was "probably" working for the US-military, either in Munich or else at the US "Special Forces" facility in Bad Tölz, nearby. "Hausmann" also believed that Dombrowski was doing much of his work "from home". The suspicion that he was still working for the CIA was confirmed by further discrete surveillance and the associated observations.

=== Surveillance ended ===
Once he had been located in his lakeside retreat in Upper Bavaria, Dombrowski evidently remained adequately accessible to East German surveillance, and there are no references to further attempts to abduct or kill him. By 1976 the Stasi had filed 37 report on his movements from their informants (and/or other sources). Post cards and letters from Gerda Dombrowski to her friends in the east continued to be monitored, and on 7 August 1977 her latest letter included the information that her husband had recently died. A subsequent letter from Mrs. Dombrowski, dated 24 August 1970, spelled out that her husband had suffered a fatal heart attack while changing a wheel on his car alongside the southbound carriageway of the Autobahn between Nuremberg and Ingolstadt. After carefully satisfying themselves over the relevant details, the eastern Security Services terminated their surveillance operations against Gerda Dombrowski on 15 June 1978. In the absence of her husband, she was no longer a "person of interest". Slightly over two months later, on 22 August 1978, the district court in Berlin-Köpenick, quietly filed away the arrest warrant they had been holding for Dombrowski that had, some time earlier, been issued by a Berlin military court.
