= Rudolf Hellmann =

German sports official and politician (1926–2005)

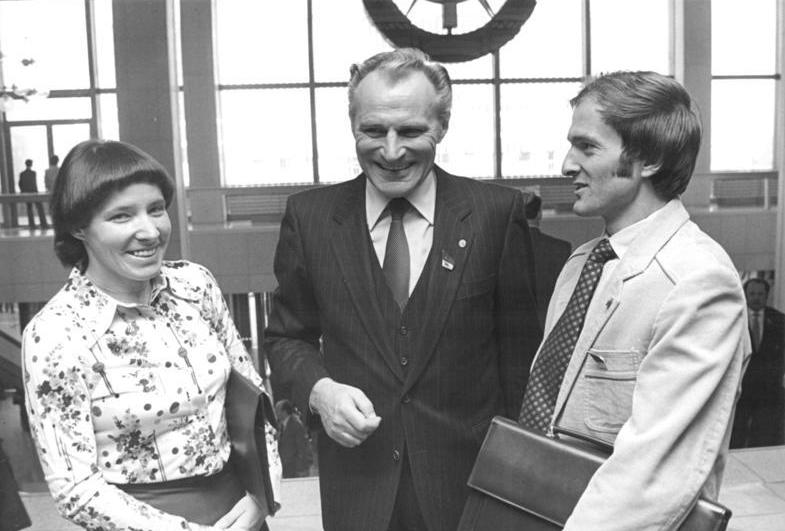
- Hellmann in 1981

Head of the Sports Department of the Central Committee
- In office 20 May 1959 – 3 December 1989
- Secretary: Erich Honecker; Paul Verner; Egon Krenz
- Deputy: Walter Gröger; Rudolf Kühnel
- Preceded by: Franz Rydz
- Succeeded by: Position abolished

Personal details
- Born: 26 June 1926 Chemnitz, Free State of Saxony, Weimar Republic (now Germany)
- Died: 31 December 2005 (aged 79)
- Party: Socialist Unity Party (1946–1989)
- Other political affiliations: Communist Party of Germany (1946)
- Occupation: Politician; Party Functionary; Machinist

Rudolf Hellmann (26 June 1926 – 31 December 2005) was a German politician and sports functionary. He was considered the most important sports politician in East Germany, alongside Manfred Ewald and Erich Mielke.

Hellmann was born in Chemnitz in Saxony, Germany. He was born as the son to a lathe operator and completed apprenticeship as a machine fitter from 1940 to 1943. He was then drafted into the Wehrmacht. Hellman voluntarily joined the Kriegsmarine in 1944 as a torpedo mechanic. He was eventually captured by British forces.

Hellmann became a member of the Communist Party of Germany (KPD). He then became a member of the new Socialist Unity Party of Germany (SED), after the merger between the KPD and the Social Democratic Party of Germany (SPD) in 1946 in the Soviet Zone. Hellman worked as a locksmith for the Deutsche Reichsbahn in Karl-Marx-Stadt from 1947 to 1950. He became an instructor for the Free German Youth (FDJ) at the Deutsche Reichsbahn office in Karl-Marx Stadt in 1950. He then became a regional manager (German: Landesleiter) of sports association SV Lokomotiv in Saxony. Hellman was a member of the Volkspolizei and served as the Sector Manager (German: Sektorsleiter) of the Department of Agitation and Propaganda of the central management of SV Lokomotiv in East Berlin from 1952. He again served as the sector manager of the Department of Agitation at the Sports and Technology Association in 1952–53.

Hellmann became an instructor for Youth and Sports of the SED regional district administration in Bezirk Halle in 1954. He then became the head of the working group for Physical Culture and Sport (German: Körperkultur und Sport) of the SED Central Committee from 1960. The working group became the Department for Physical Culture and Sport in 1965. Hellmann would serve as the Head of the Department for Physical Culture and Sport of the SED Central Committee until 1989.

Hellmann acted as a sports consultant of Walter Ulbricht, Erich Honecker and Egon Krenz. He also became a member of the Competitive Sports Commission (German: Leistungssportkommission) in 1960. Helllmann was promoted to the federal board of the German Gymnastics and Sports Federation (DTSB) a year later. He then served as the vice president of the East German National Olympic Committee from 1973 to 1989. Hellman was awarded the Patriotic Order of Merit in 1960, 1964 and 1964. He was also awarded the Banner of Labor in 1970, the Order of Karl Marx in 1976 and the Star of People's Friendship in 1980. Hellmann was also awarded the Olympic Order of the International Olympic Committee in 1987.

As a result of political reform in East Germany, there was increasing public criticism of state subsidies for elite sports programs. This pressure led Hellmann to resign his position as vice president of the East German National Olympic Committee. A large majority of the delegates at the 17th conference of the federal board of the DTSB on 28–29 January 1990 in Kienbaum then voted to expel Hellmann, along with Manfred Ewald and others, from the presidium of the DTSB. Hellmann was convicted of crimes connected with the doping of East German athletes in 2000. He received a ten-month suspended jail sentence.

Hellmann died in 2005. He is the father to German former gymnast Angelika Hellmann.
