= Franz Rydz =

German politician (1927–2007)

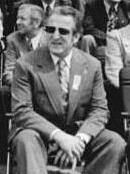
- Rydz in 1977

Head of the Sports Sector in the Security Affairs Department of the Central Committee of the SED (Note: Youth and Sports Sector in the LOPMO Department until 31 August 1955)
- In office January 1953 – 20 May 1959
- Secretary: Erich Honecker; Paul Verner
- Preceded by: Position established
- Succeeded by: Rudolf Hellmann

Personal details
- Born: Franz Rydz; 27 May 1927 Salsitz, Province of Saxony, Free State of Prussia, Weimar Republic (now Saxony-Anhalt, Germany)
- Died: 20 November 1989 (aged 62) Kienbaum, Bezirk Frankfurt (Oder), East Germany
- Cause of death: Suicide by firearm
- Party: Socialist Unity Party
- Education: "Karl Marx" Party Academy
- Occupation: Sports Official; Party Functionary
- Central institution membership: 1959–1976: Member, FDJ Central Council; Other offices held: 1970–1989: Treasurer, National Olympic Committee of the German Democratic Republic; 1961–1989: Vice President, Deutscher Fußball-Verband der DDR; 1966–1989: Vice President, Deutscher Turn- und Sportbund; 1959–1966: Secretary, Deutscher Turn- und Sportbund

Franz Rydz (27 May 1927 – 20 November 1989) was an East German high-ranking sports official and party functionary of the Socialist Unity Party (SED).

Rydz started his career in the SED apparatus, later serving as a high-ranking official in several East German sports organizations, including as vice president of both the German Gymnastics and Sports Federation and the East German German Football Association.

Early on during the Peaceful Revolution, Rydz shot himself.

== Life and career ==
Rydz was born on 27 May 1927 in Salsitz, then part of the Prussian Province of Saxony. Following the establishment of East Germany, Rydz served as chairman of the State Sports Committee of Saxony-Anhalt from 1950 to 1952.

After attending the SED's "Karl Marx" Party Academy, he joined the apparatus of the Central Committee of the SED as head of the newly established Youth and Sports Sector in the LOPMO Department in 1953, reorganized as Sports Sector in the Security Affairs Department in August 1955. This made him the highest-ranking party official for sports at the time.

In May 1959, he was transferred to the German Gymnastics and Sports Federation (German: Deutscher Turn- und Sportbund, DTSB), the recently created mass organization for all East German sports. He was succeeded as sector head by Rudolf Hellmann.

He initially joined the DTSB as secretary, being promoted to vice president with responsibility for finance in 1966. Additionally, he was a member of the Central Council of the Free German Youth from 1959 to 1976. Furthermore, he was vice president of the East German Football Association of the German Democratic Republic starting in 1961 and, from 1970, treasurer of East Germany's National Olympic Committee.

Among the leading East German sports officials, Rydz was more open towards what the SED deemed the "commercialization" of sports, culminating in him signing an advertising contract with West German sports apparel company Adidas in May 1982 as DTSB vice president. Rydz had previously been accused of repeatedly having been to West Germany to buy shoes for top East German athletes in 1970.

In the early 1970s, Rydz unsuccessfully tried to pressure East Germany national football team member Jürgen Croy to transfer from his club BSG Sachsenring Zwickau to a more prominent Bezirk-level club.

== Death ==
During the Peaceful Revolution, many high-ranking East German sports officials came under intensive public scrutiny, facing accusations of corruption and embezzlement. On 20 November 1989, Rydz destroyed potentially incriminating documents for one and a half hours and later died from a self-inflicted gunshot wound in Kienbaum, seat of the Olympic National Training Centre. After his death, 291,000 West German marks in cash were found in his East Berlin office. The cash is said to have been used to buy sports equipment and medicines in the West, among other things. Rydz was one of several mid-level SED functionaries to commit suicide during the Peaceful Revolution.

After German reunification, many high-ranking East German sports officials were convicted for their involvement in the mass doping of East German athletes.
