= Ines Geipel =

German academic and former athlete (born 1960)

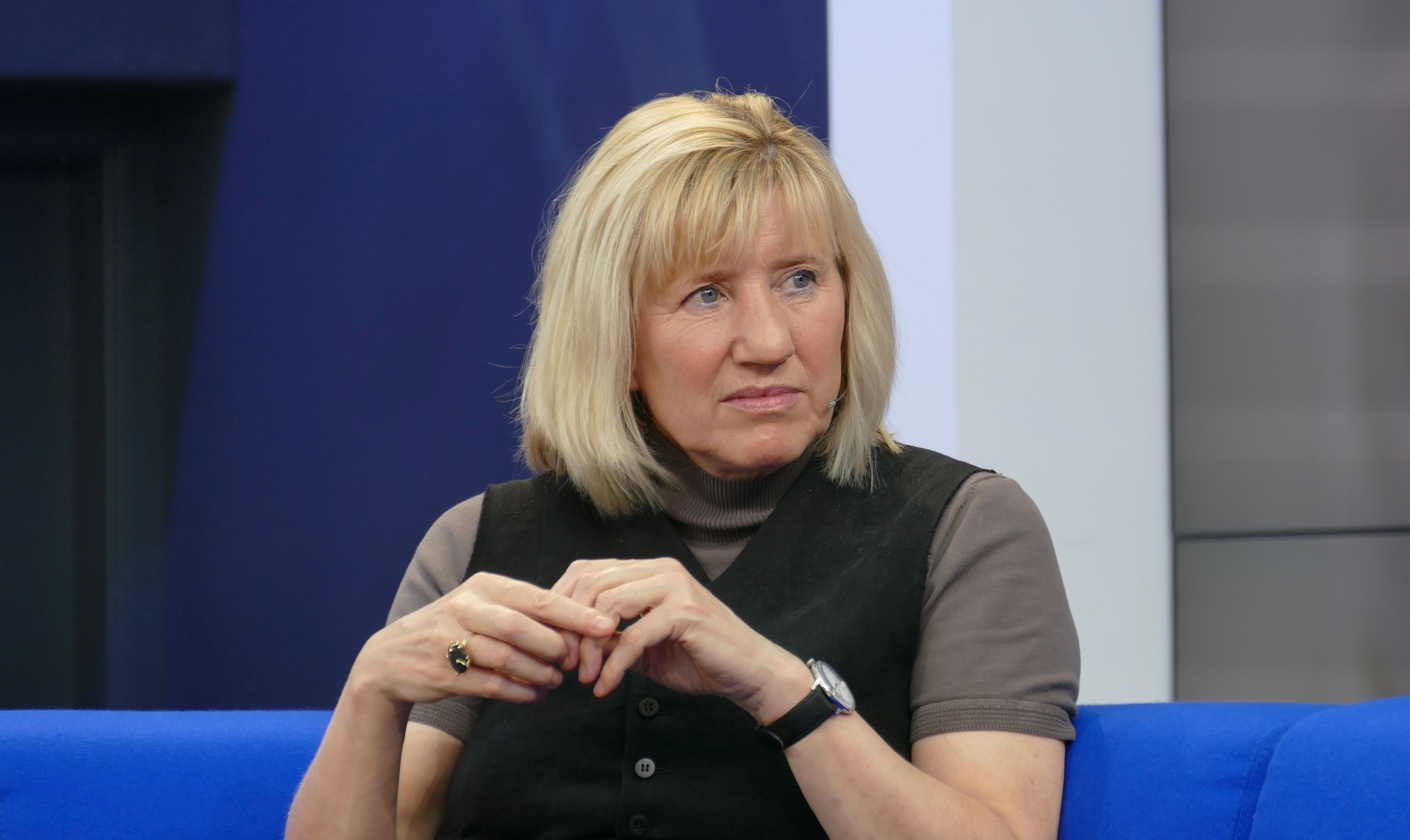
Geipel in 2019

Ines Geipel (born 1960) is a German academic and former athlete. She is professor of German versification at the Ernst Busch Academy of Dramatic Arts (Hochschule für Schauspielkunst Ernst Busch) in Berlin.

She was born in 1960 in Dresden in the then East Germany. She was a competitive athlete there before escaping to the West in 1989. After her escape, she was expelled from the Socialist Unity Party of Germany, of which she had previously been a party member. She studied sociology and philosophy in Darmstadt.

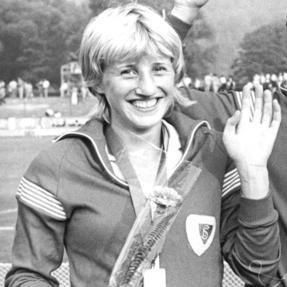
Geipel in 1981

As an athlete she was a victim of doping in East Germany, and she was president from 2013 to 2018 of the group Help for Victims of Doping (Doping-Opfer-Hilfe). She was a co-plaintiff in the 2000 trial of Manfred Ewald and Manfred Höppner.

In 2019 she was the subject of an episode of the BBC series HARDtalk, interviewed by Stephen Sackur.

== Awards ==
In 2011 Geipel was awarded the Bundesverdienstkreuz (Cross of Merit) for her writing and political engagement. and in 2020 the Lessing Prize for Criticism.

== Selected publications ==
- Geipel, Ines:(August 2024) Fabelland: Der Osten, der Westen, der Zorn und das Glück
- Geipel, Ines (2024). Behind the Wall: My Brother, My Family and Hatred in East Germany. Polity. ISBN 978-1509559978.

Originally published as Umkämpfte Zone. Mein Bruder, der Osten und der Hass (2019)

- Geipel, Ines; Somers, Nick (2024). Beautiful new sky: fabricating bodies for outer space in East Germany's military laboratories. Hoboken: Polity Press. ISBN 978-1509559992.

Originally published as Schöner Neuer Himmel. Aus dem Militärlabor des Ostens (2022)
