= German Archery Association =

Sports governing body in Germany

- Deutscher Bogensport-Verband
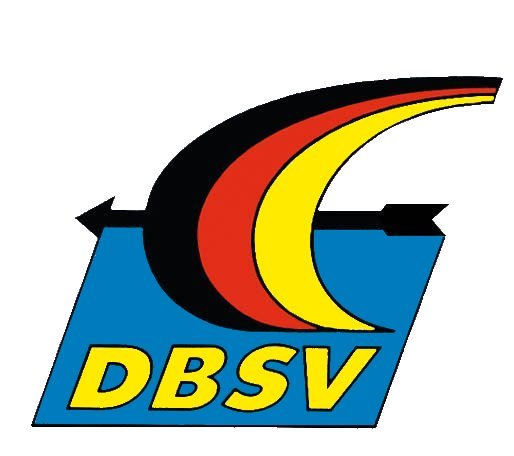
- Sport: Archery
- Membership: 4,668 (1988)
- Abbreviation: DBSV
- Founded: 23 October 1959
- Headquarters: Zittau, Germany

Official website
- www.dbsv1959.de
- (East Germany)
- (Germany)

Pre-reunification logo of the DBSV

The Deutscher Bogensport-Verband (DBSV), formerly the Deutscher Bogenschützen-Verband der DDR, is a nationwide sports association for archery in Germany. Until German reunification in 1990, it was the state-operated governing body for the sport in East Germany and operated under the umbrella of the Deutscher Turn- und Sportbund. During its time as the state governing body for archery, the DBSV participated in the East German Olympic Committee and was a member organization of the World Archery Federation. Like the other handful of East German sports associations that survived reunification, the DBSV has since spread and opened constituent associations in the rest of the nation.

== See also ==
- German Shooting and Archery Federation
- Deutscher Turn- und Sportbund
- East Germany at the Olympics
- Doping in East Germany
