= Geipel =

Geipel is a German surname. Notable people with the surname include:

- Finn Geipel (born 1958), German architect and urbanist
- Ines Geipel (born 1960), German academic and former athlete
- Philip Geipel (born 1986), German auto racing driver
