= German Bobsleigh, Luge, and Skeleton Federation =

Sports governing body in Germany

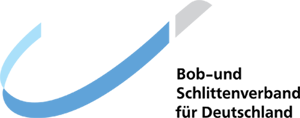
BSD logo

German Bobsleigh, Luge, and Skeleton Federation (German: Bob- und Schlittenverband für Deutschland e.V., BSD) is the official federation for bobsleigh, luge and skeleton in Germany. It is the German representative both to the International Bobsleigh and Skeleton Federation and the International Luge Federation and is part of the German Olympic Committee.

Until German reunification in 1990, East Germany operated its own governing body for bobsleigh and luge sports, the Deutscher Schlitten- und Bobsportverband.

BSD is headquartered in Berchtesgaden.
