= Bund Deutscher Segler =

German Democratic Republic sailing sports governing body

Federation of German Sailors
- Bund Deutscher Segler
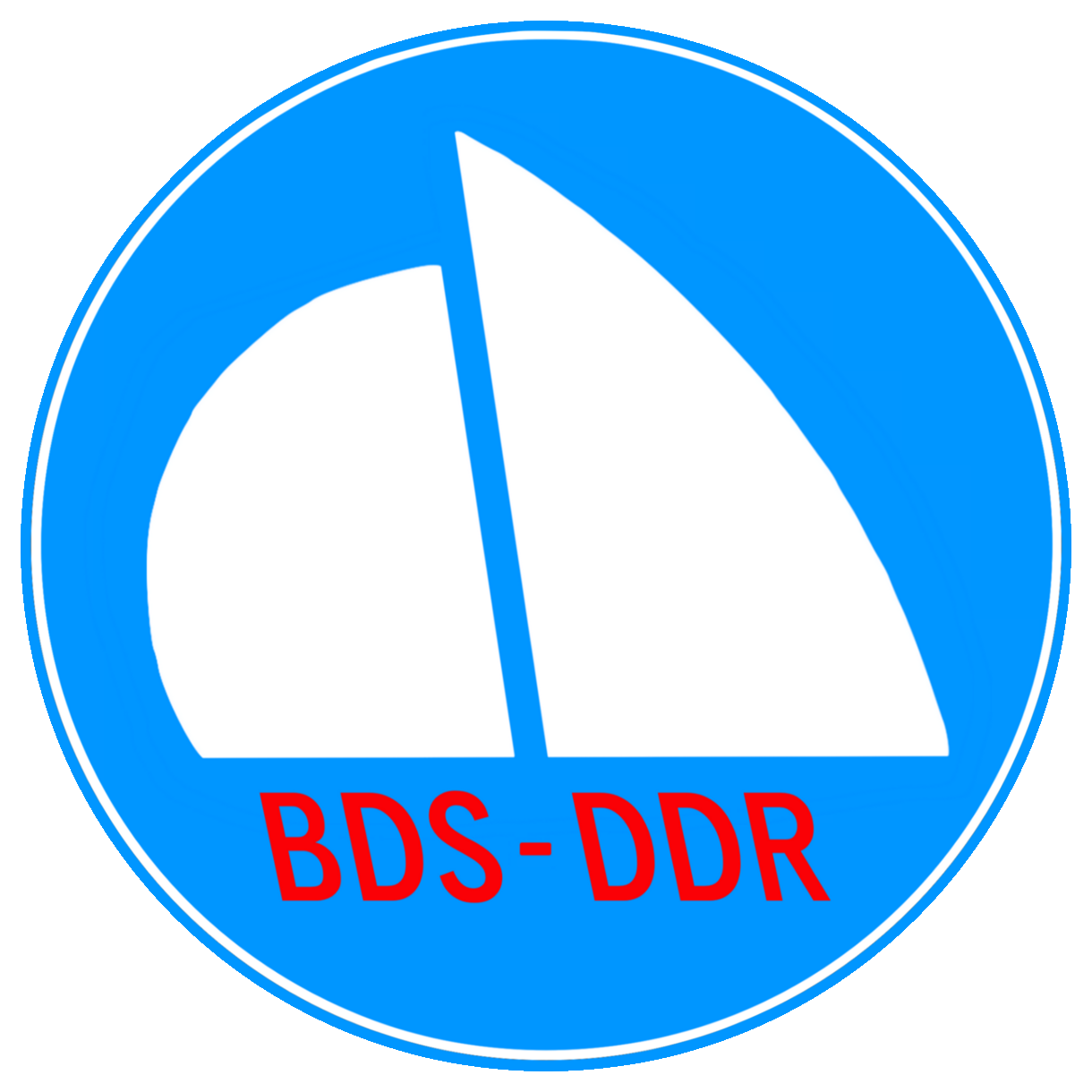
- Sport: Sailing
- Membership: 31,318 (1988)
- Abbreviation: BDS
- Founded: 20 April 1958
- Headquarters: East Berlin, German Democratic Republic
- Closure date: 12 January 1991
- (East Germany)

The Bund Deutscher Segler (BDS) was the governing body of the Deutscher Turn- und Sportbund for sailing sports in the German Democratic Republic (GDR). It was founded in East Berlin in April 1958 and merged with the German Sailing Federation after German reunification in early 1991. By 1988 it had 31,318 members and 2,231 trainers across the GDR.

== Presidents of the BDS ==
Günther Kley	1958–1961
Herbert Fechner	1961–1990
Walter Kaczmarek	1990–1991
