= Deutscher Schlitten- und Bobsportverband =

East German luge and bobsleigh organisation

German Sled and Bobsleigh Association
- Deutscher Schlitten- und Bobsportverband
- Membership: 4,206 (1988)
- Abbreviation: DSBV
- Founded: 1957
- Headquarters: East Berlin, German Democratic Republic
- Closure date: 1990
- (East Germany)

The Deutscher Schlitten- und Bobsportverband (DSBV) was the governing body for the sports of luge and bobsleigh in the German Democratic Republic.

The DSBV was founded in 1957 under the umbrella of the larger Deutscher Turn- und Sportbund. It succeeded an earlier organization, founded in Oberhof in 1953. One of the smallest sports governing bodies in the GDR, the Deutscher Schlitten- und Bobsportverband had 3,759 athletes and 447 trainers in 1988.

Upon German reunification in 1990, the DSBV was absorbed into the German Bobsleigh and Sled Sport Association.

== Presidents of the DSBV ==
Heinz Rustemeier	1957–1962
Erhard Feuereiss	1962–1976
Hans Friedrich	1976–1982
Martin Kilian	1982–1990
Karl-Heinz Anschütz	1990
