= Herbert Fechner =

German politician

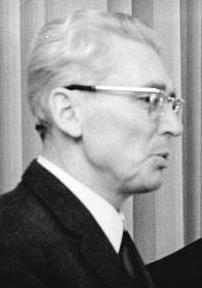
- Fechner in 1970

2nd Lord Mayor of East Berlin
- In office 7 July 1967 – 2 November 1974
- Preceded by: Friedrich Ebert Jr.
- Succeeded by: Erhard Krack

President of the Federation of German Sailors
- In office 1961–1990
- Preceded by: Günther Kley
- Succeeded by: Walter Kaczmarek

Personal details
- Born: 27 August 1913 Berlin, Kingdom of Prussia, German Empire
- Died: 28 December 1998 (aged 85) Berlin, Germany
- Party: Socialist Unity Party of Germany (1946–); Social Democratic Party of Germany (1945–1946)

Herbert Kurt Fechner (27 August 1913 – 28 December 1998) was an East German politician who served as the second Lord Mayor of East Berlin from 1967 to 1974.

== Biography ==
Fechner was born on 27 August 1913 in Berlin, the capital of the German Empire at the time. His father was a carpenter. He joined the Sozialistische Arbeiterjugend (SAJ) or Socialist Workers' Youth (in English) in 1927 at the age of 13. He did various jobs as a child in Berlin from 1928 to 1933 and worked as a construction worker from 1933 to 1935, then as a telegraph construction worker until 1948. Fechner served for Nazi Germany during World War II. After the end of the war in 1945, he joined the Social Democratic Party of Germany (SPD) and was a member until 1946 when the SPD and the Communist Party of Germany (KPD) merged, then remained a member of the newly formed Socialist Unity Party of Germany. He was also a member of the Free German Trade Union Federation. In 1951, Fechner became a member of the East Berlin city council (until 1961). He served as the Lord Mayor of East Berlin from 1967 to 1974. Additionally, Fechner was the President of the Federation of German Sailors for nearly thirty years, serving from 1961 to 1990.

Fechner died on 28 December 1998 and was buried in Waldfriedhof Oberschöneweide in Oberschöneweide, Berlin.
