= Klaus Eichler =

President of the German Gymnastics and Sports Federation
- In office 1988 – December 1989
- Preceded by: Manfred Ewald
- Succeeded by: Martin Kilian

Personal details
- Born: October 11, 1939; Halle, Nazi Germany
- Died: January 24, 1994 (aged 54); Lake Constance
- Political party: SED; PDS
- Occupation: Bureaucrat
- Awards: Patriotic Order of Merit

Klaus Eichler (11 October 1939 – 24 January 1994) was a former party and sporting official in East Germany.

== Biography ==
Eichler began his career in government in the 1960s, when he became actively involved in district management of the Free German Youth (FDJ) and the ruling Socialist Unity Party, eventually becoming a member of the FDJ's Central Council. In 1974 he was appointed general director of Jugendtourist, the FDJ's tourist agency.

In 1984 Eichler became the vice-president of the Deutscher Turn- und Sportbund (DTSB), the main governing body for sports in East Germany. Upon then-incumbent President Manfred Ewald's retirement for health reasons in 1988, Eichler was approved as his successor by Erich Honecker and Egon Krenz. Eichler held this post until he and all other members of the DTSB's executive committee resigned at the end of 1989.

After German reunification in 1990, Eichler was involved in the SED's successor, the Party of Democratic Socialism and became managing director of travel agency "Tuk International" that offered trips with former East German sports stars. The travel agency also organized the plane ticket for Honecker's departure to Chile.

Eichler died in a plane crash in Lake Constance in 1994.
