= Martin Kilian =

East German bobsledder and politician

President of the German Gymnastics and Sports Federation
- In office 1990
- Preceded by: Klaus Eichler
- Succeeded by: Office abolished

President of the German Sled and Bobsleigh Association
- In office 1982–1990
- Preceded by: Hans Friedrich
- Succeeded by: Karl-Heinz Anschütz

Mayor of Wernigerode
- In office 24 October 1962 – 1990
- Preceded by: Gustav Strahl
- Succeeded by: Herbert Teubner

Personal details
- Born: May 21, 1928 Namslau, German Reich
- Died: July 2, 2014 (aged 86) Wernigerode, Germany
- Party: SED
- Occupation: Sportsman, teacher, politician
- Awards: Patriotic Order of Merit; Honored Master of Sports

Martin Kilian (21 May 1928–2 July 2014) was an East German bobsledder and politician of the Socialist Unity Party. He served as president of both the Deutscher Turn- und Sportbund and the Deutscher Schlitten- und Bobsportverband in the final decade of the GDR and served as mayor of Wernigerode for almost thirty years.

== Biography ==
Martin Kilian was born in 1928 in Lower Silesia, then still a part of Germany. After the expulsion of Germans from Silesia during and after World War II, Kilian settled in Nachterstedt and was employed as a miner before moving to Wernigerode. He joined the newly-formed SED in 1948. In 1950, Kilian became active in bobsledding and began working as a schoolteacher the following year. By the end of the decade he was made principal of the Wilhelm Rabbe High School. Upon the death of mayor Gustav Strahl, he became mayor of Wernigerode in 1962.

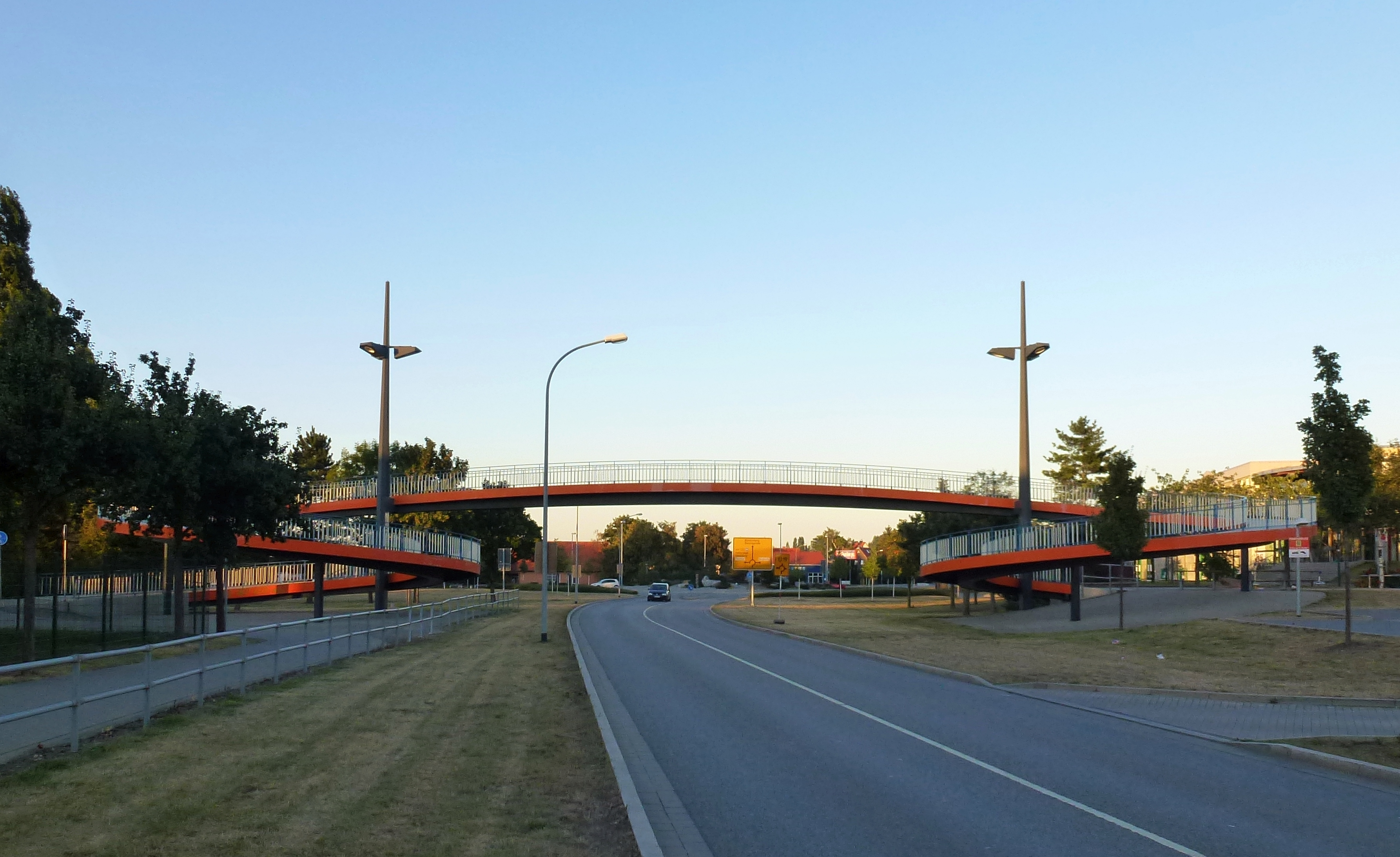
The Martin Kilian Bridge in Wernigerode

In 1982 he became the president of the German Sled and Bobsleigh Association (DSBV), in which capacity he served until shortly before the dissolution of the GDR. In 1990, shortly before German reunification, he served as the final president of the German Gymnastics and Sports Federation. He was also the vice-president of the International Bobsleigh and Skeleton Federation.

Kilian died on 2 July 2014 at the age of 86. In 2016, a large pedestrian bridge he helped create in Wernigerode was renamed in his honor.
