= Podjuchy =

Neighbourhood of Szczecin, Poland

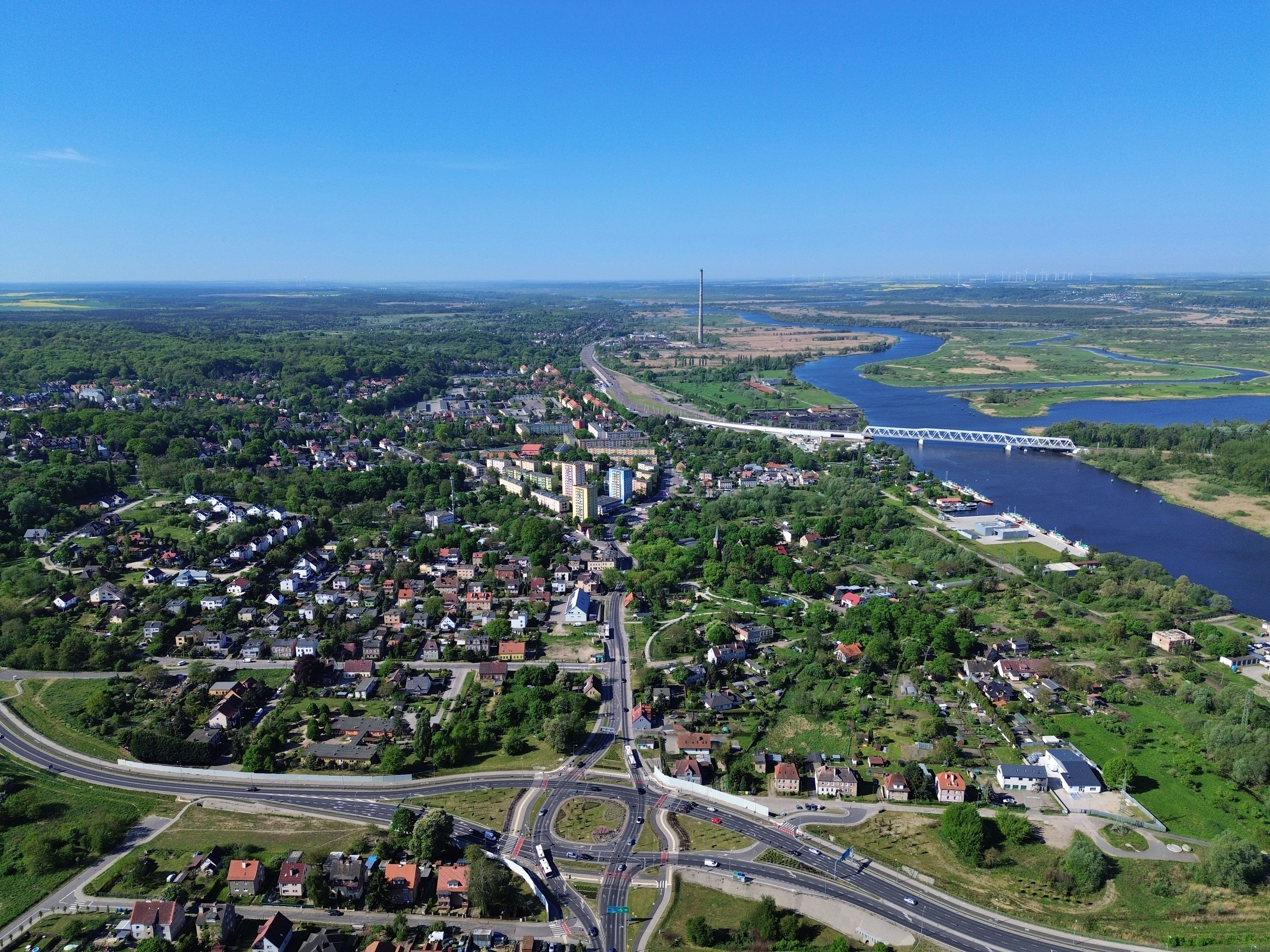
- Aerial view of Podjuchy

- Location of Podjuchy in Szczecin
- Coordinates: 53.3656°N 14.5927°E
- Country: Poland
- Voivodeship: West Pomeranian
- County/City: Szczecin
- Time zone: UTC+1 (CET)
  - Summer (DST): UTC+2 (CEST)
- Vehicle registration: ZS
- Primary airport: Solidarity Szczecin–Goleniów Airport

Podjuchy is a municipal neighborhood of the city of Szczecin, Poland situated on the right bank of the East Oder river, south-east of the Szczecin Old Town, and south-west of Szczecin-Dąbie.

The area became part of the emerging Duchy of Poland under its first ruler Mieszko I around 967, and following Poland's fragmentation in 1138, it formed part of the Duchy of Pomerania. During the Thirty Years' War, the settlement fell to the Swedish Empire under the suzerainty of the Holy Roman Empire. Later on, it passed to Prussia. From 1871, it was part of Germany until the defeat of Nazi Germany in World War II. In 1945, the area was reintegrated into Poland, within which it was known as Podejuch.

== Gallery ==
Gallery

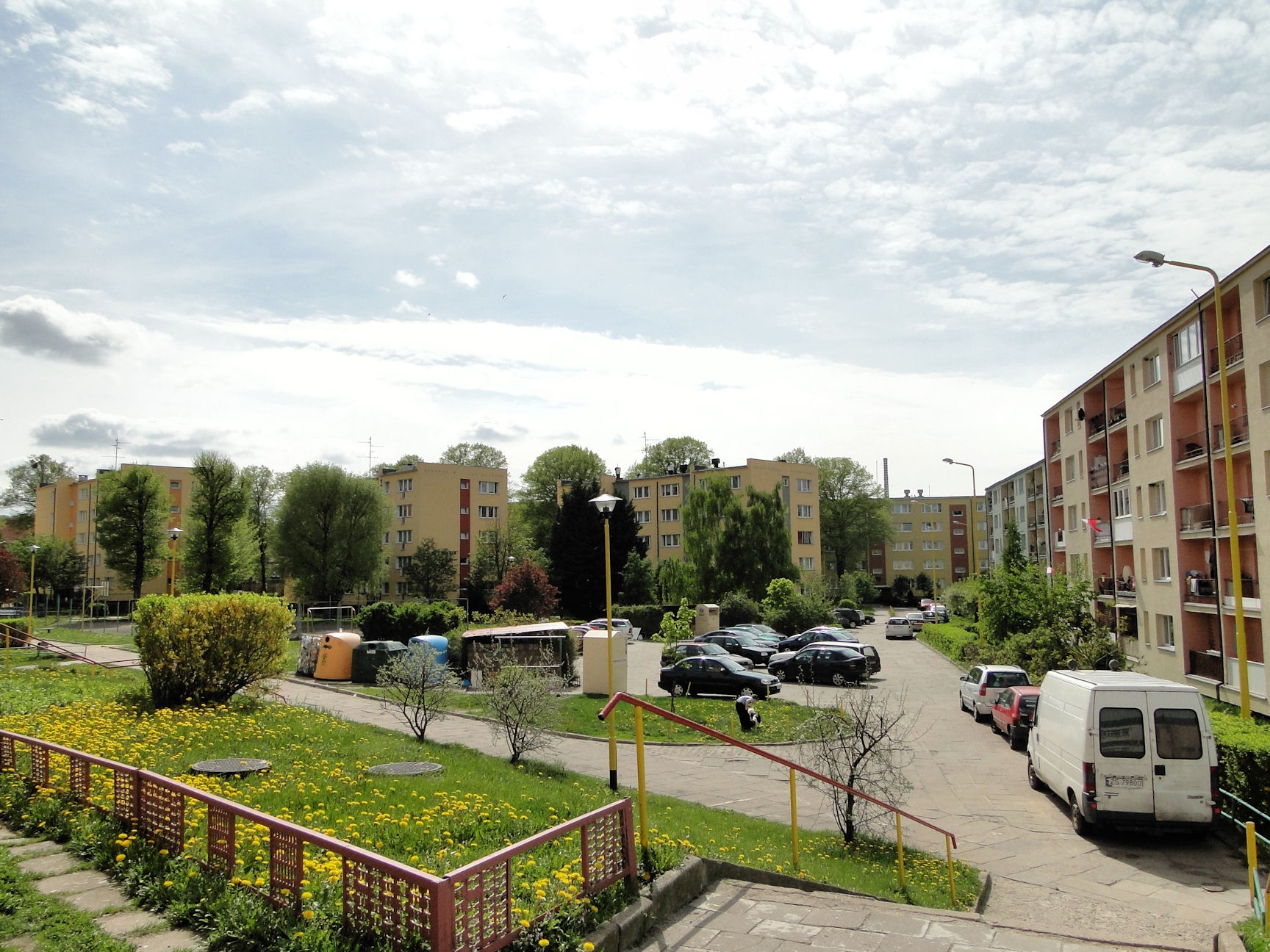
Neighbourhood S.M. "Dąb"

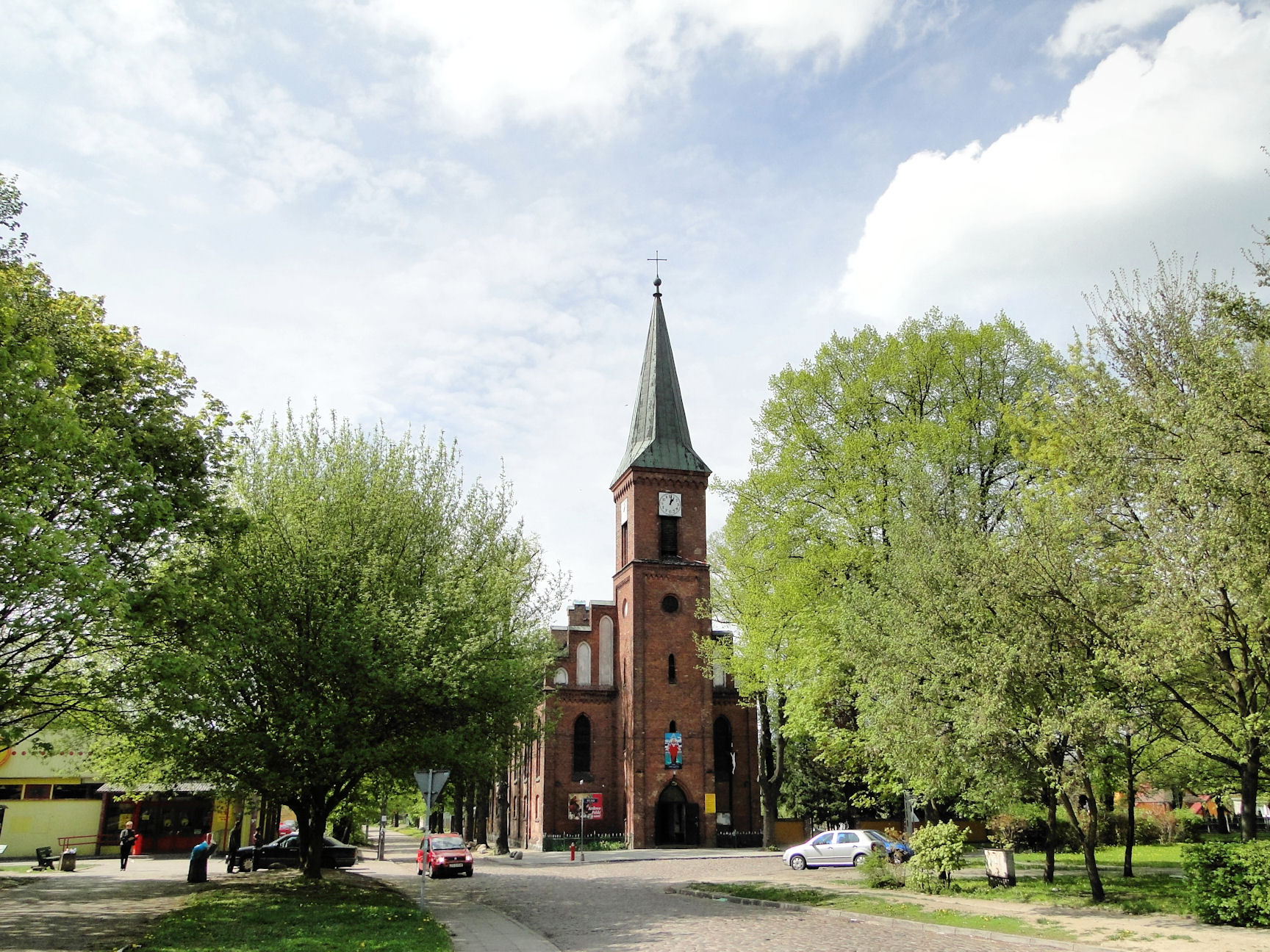
Wolności Square with the Saint Peter and Paul Church

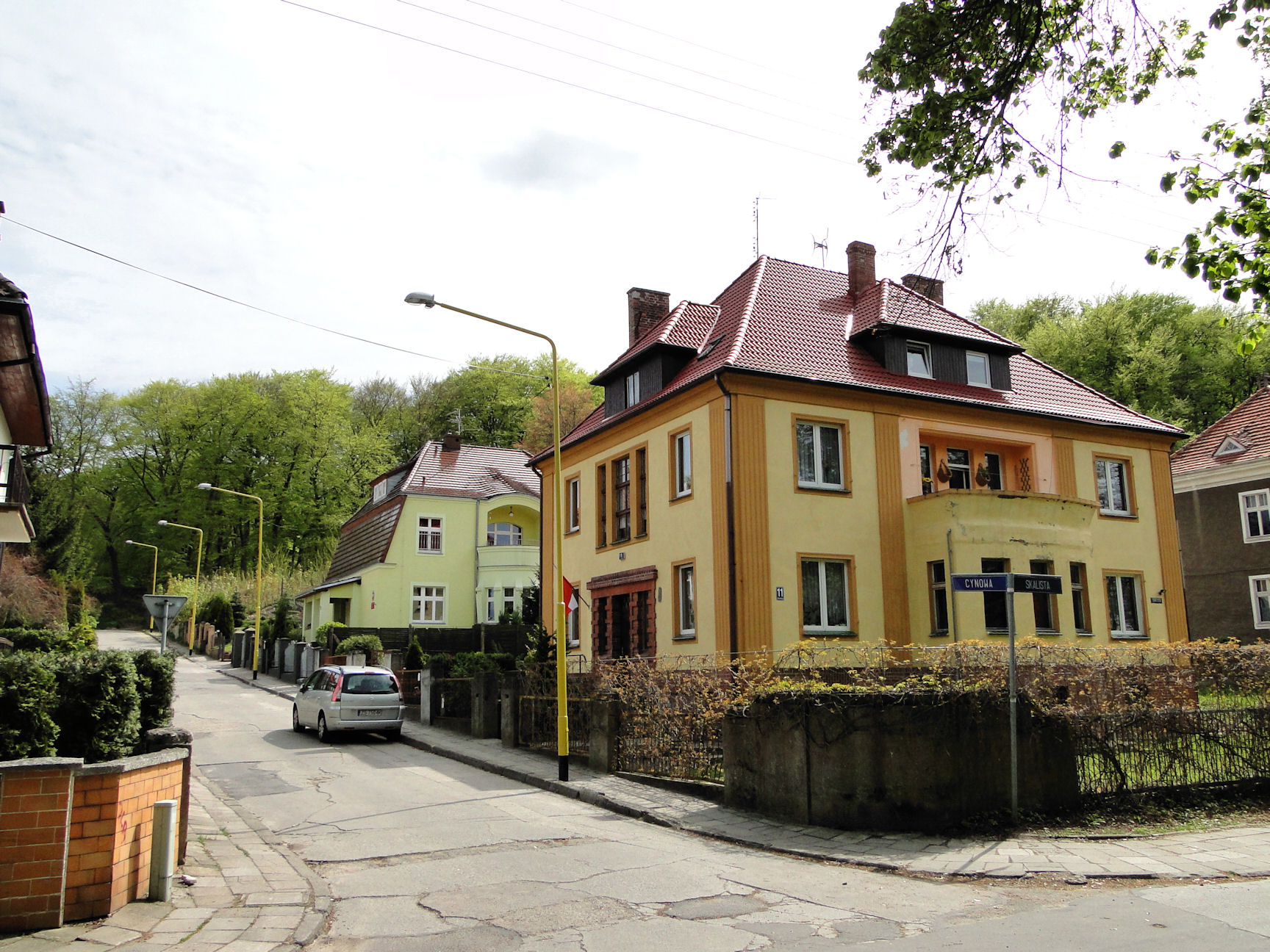
Cynowa Street with Bukowa Forest

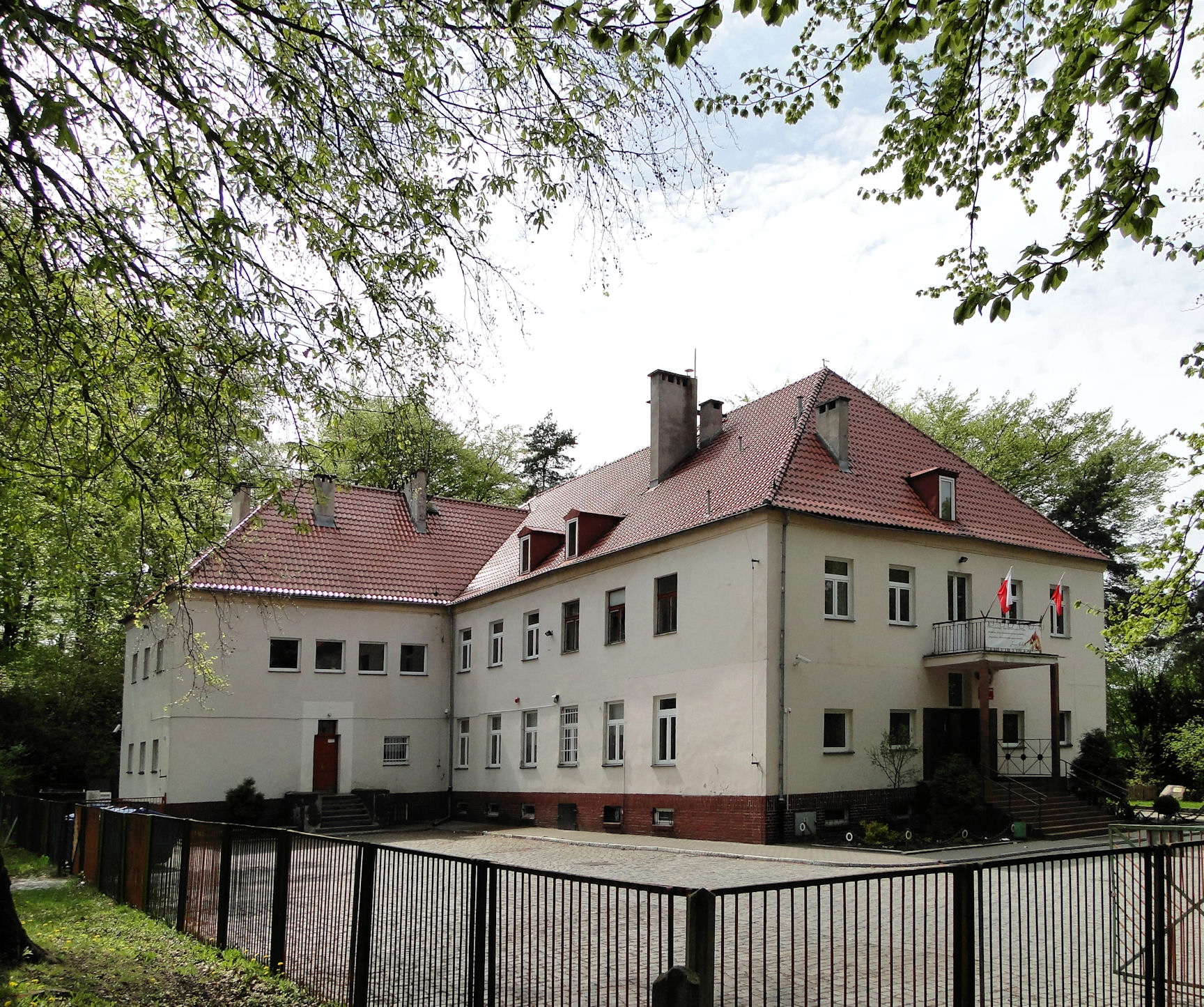
School at Skalista Street (a former casino)

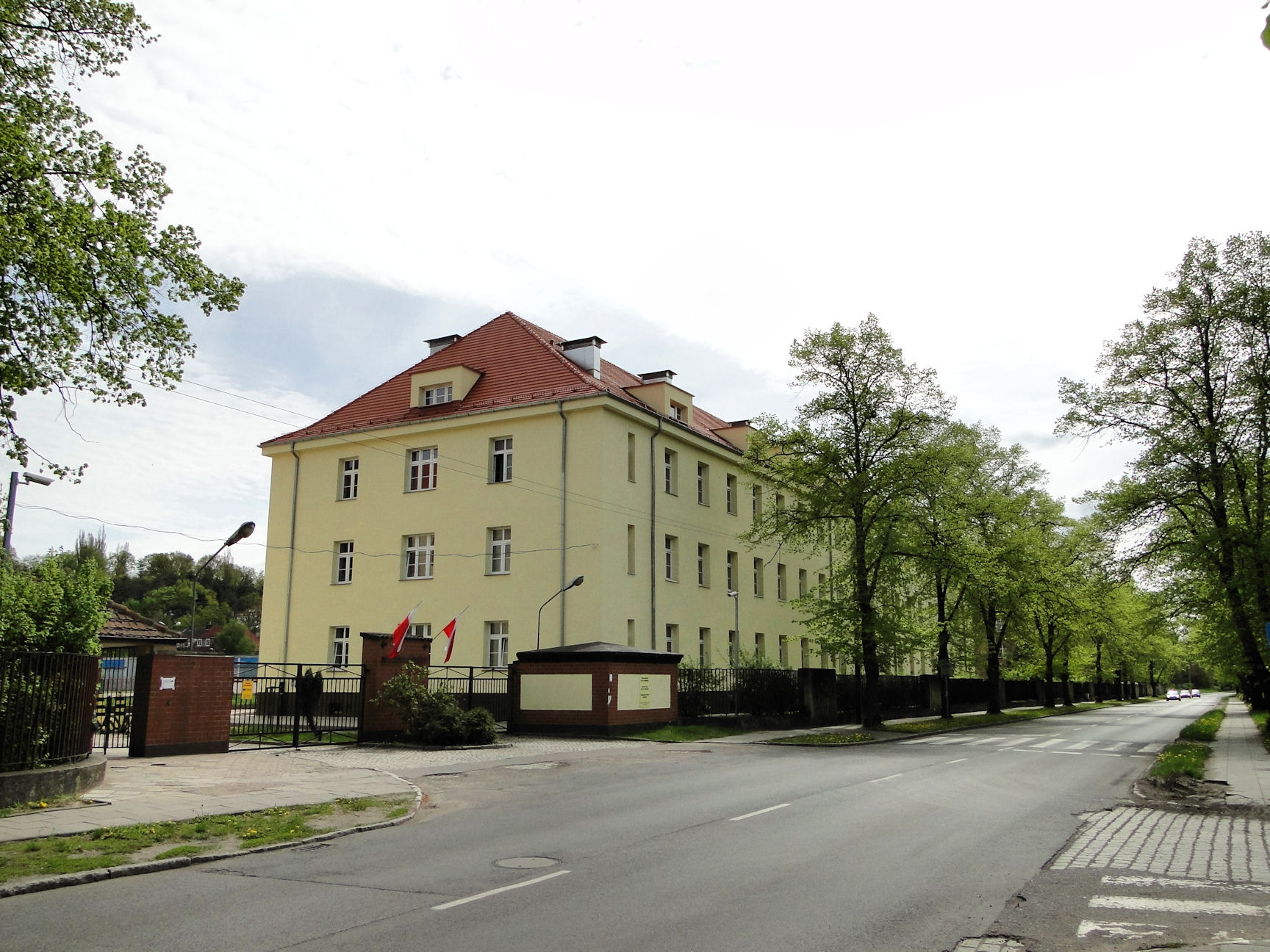
Polish Army barracks at the Metalowa Street

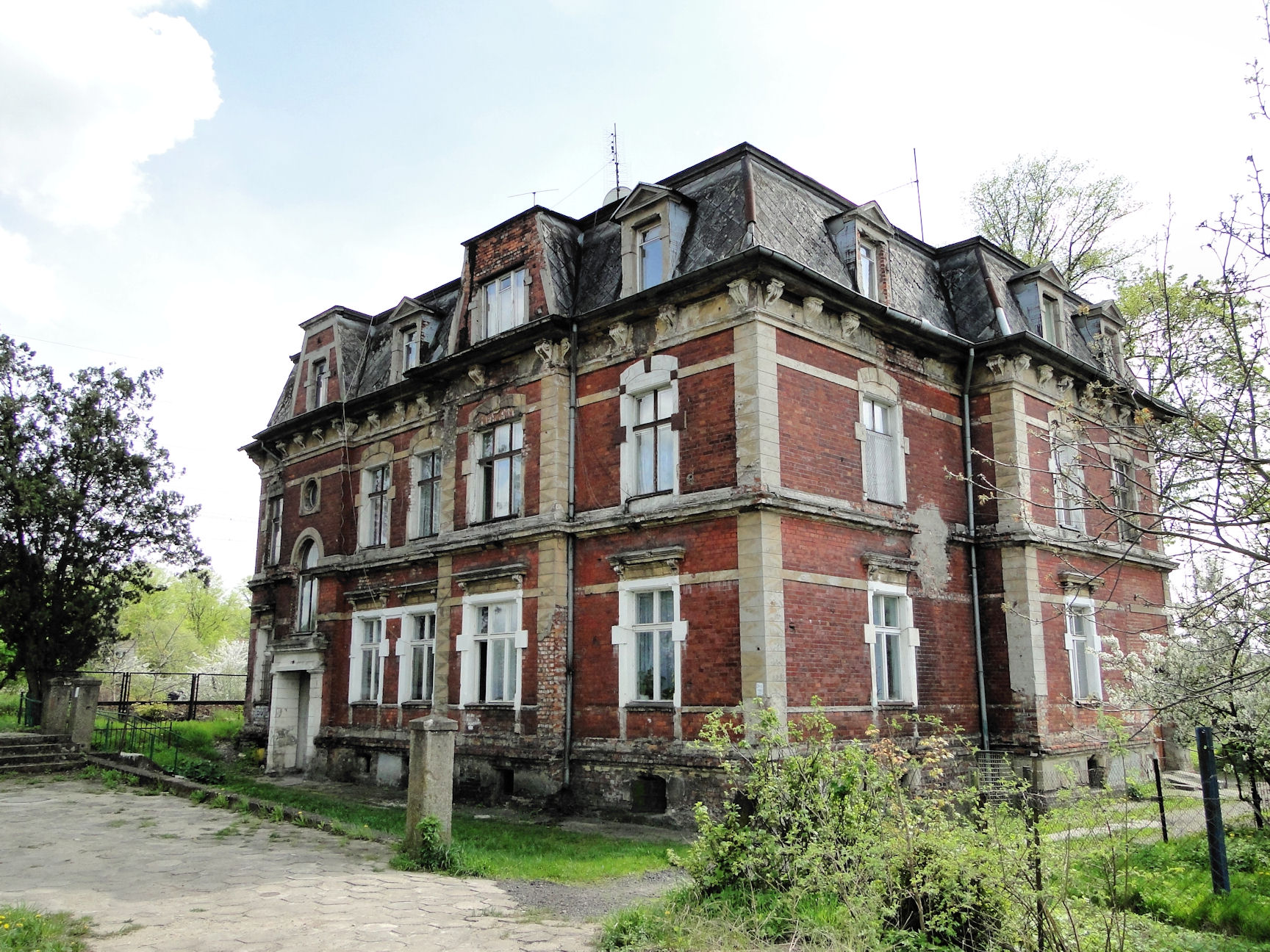
Villa at the Niklowa Street

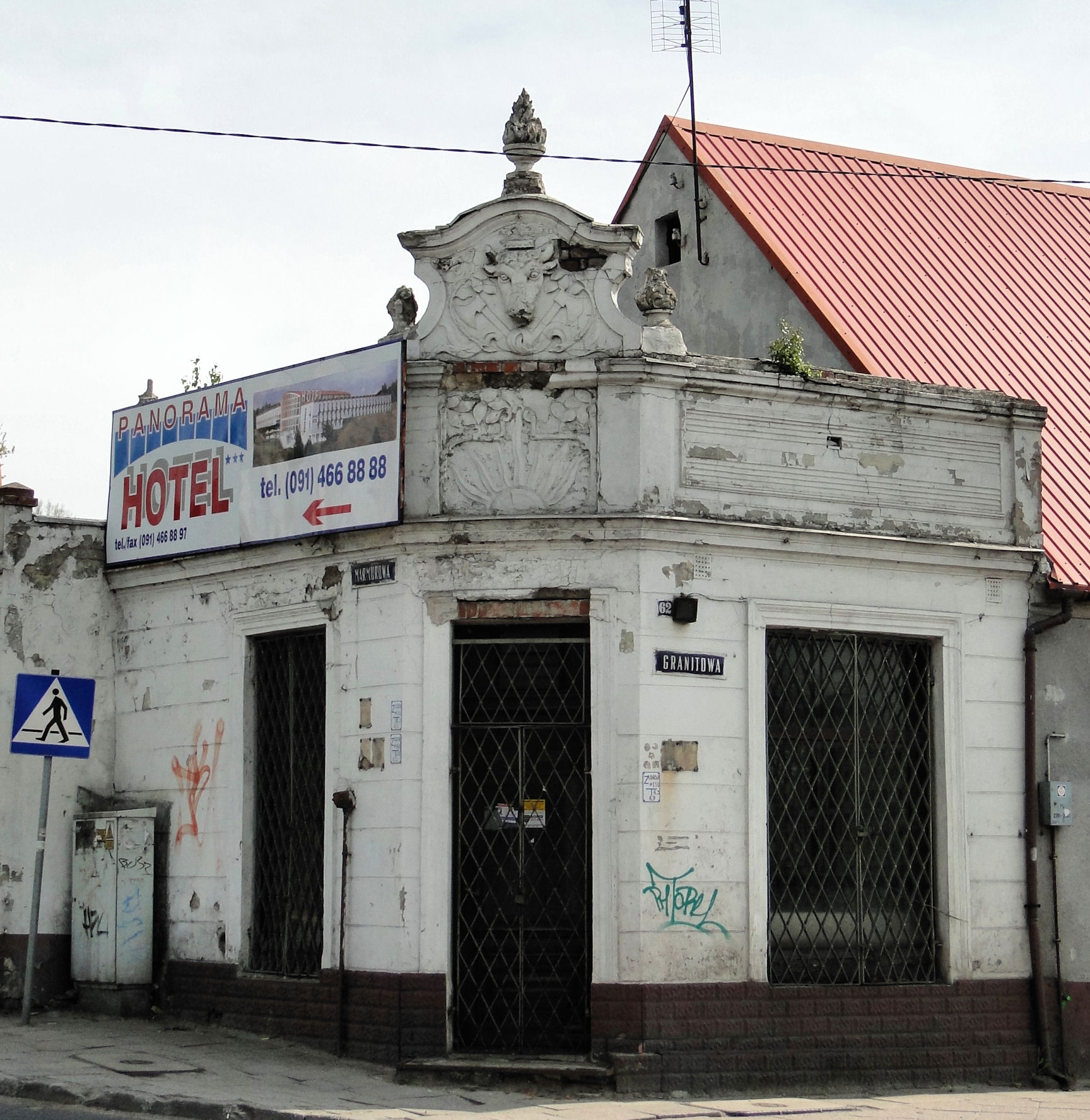
A shop at the Granitowa Street

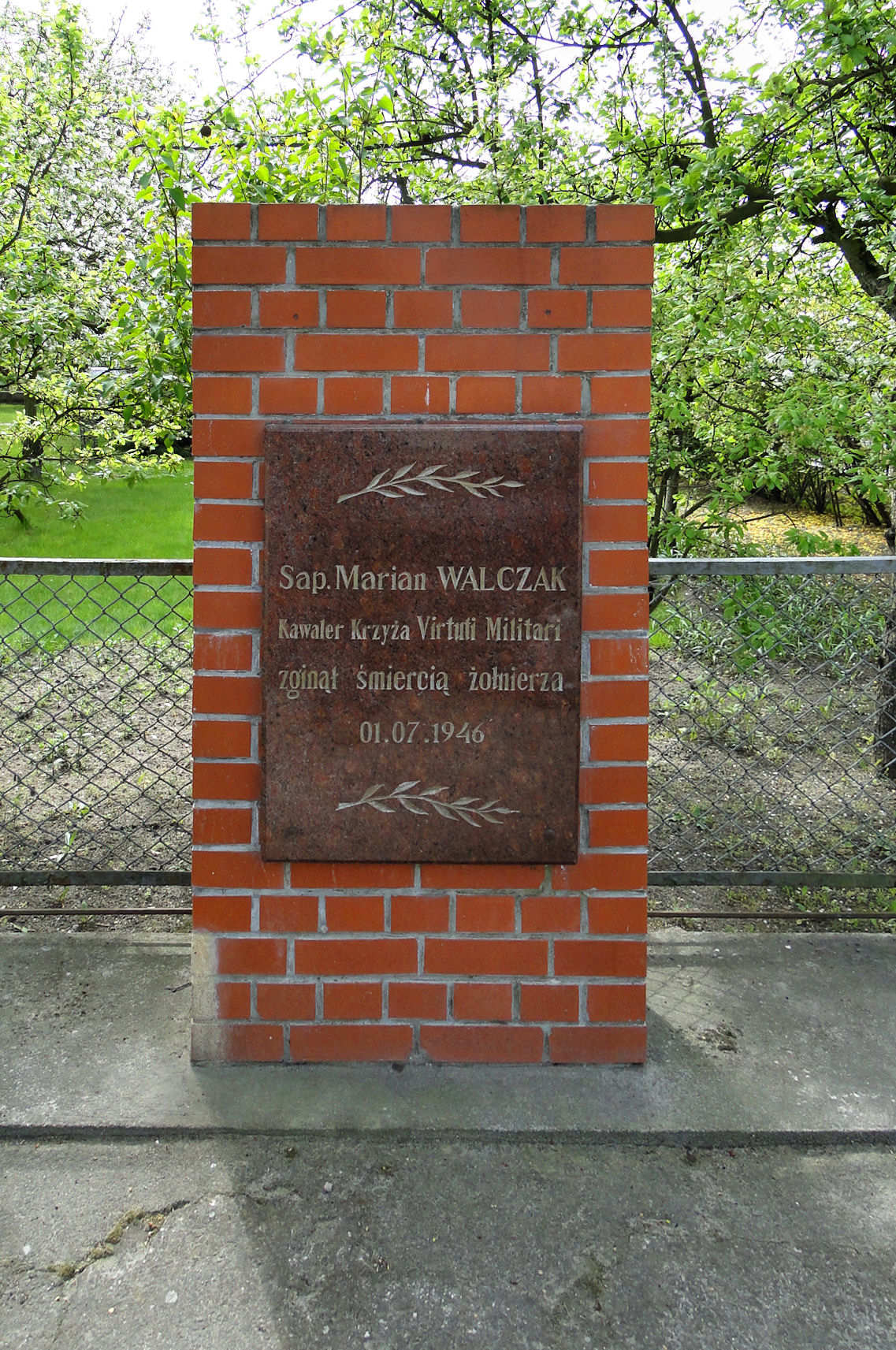
Marian Walczak Monument

== Notable residents ==
- Manfred Ewald (1926–2002), German Democratic Republic's minister of sport and president East German Olympic committee
