= Deutscher Anglerverband =

German Fishing Association
- Deutscher Anglerverband
- Sport: Angling
- Membership: 170,000 (2009)
- Abbreviation: DAV
- Founded: 13 May 1958
- Headquarters: Berlin, Germany
- Closure date: 2013

Official website
- www.dafv.de
- (East Germany)
- (Germany)

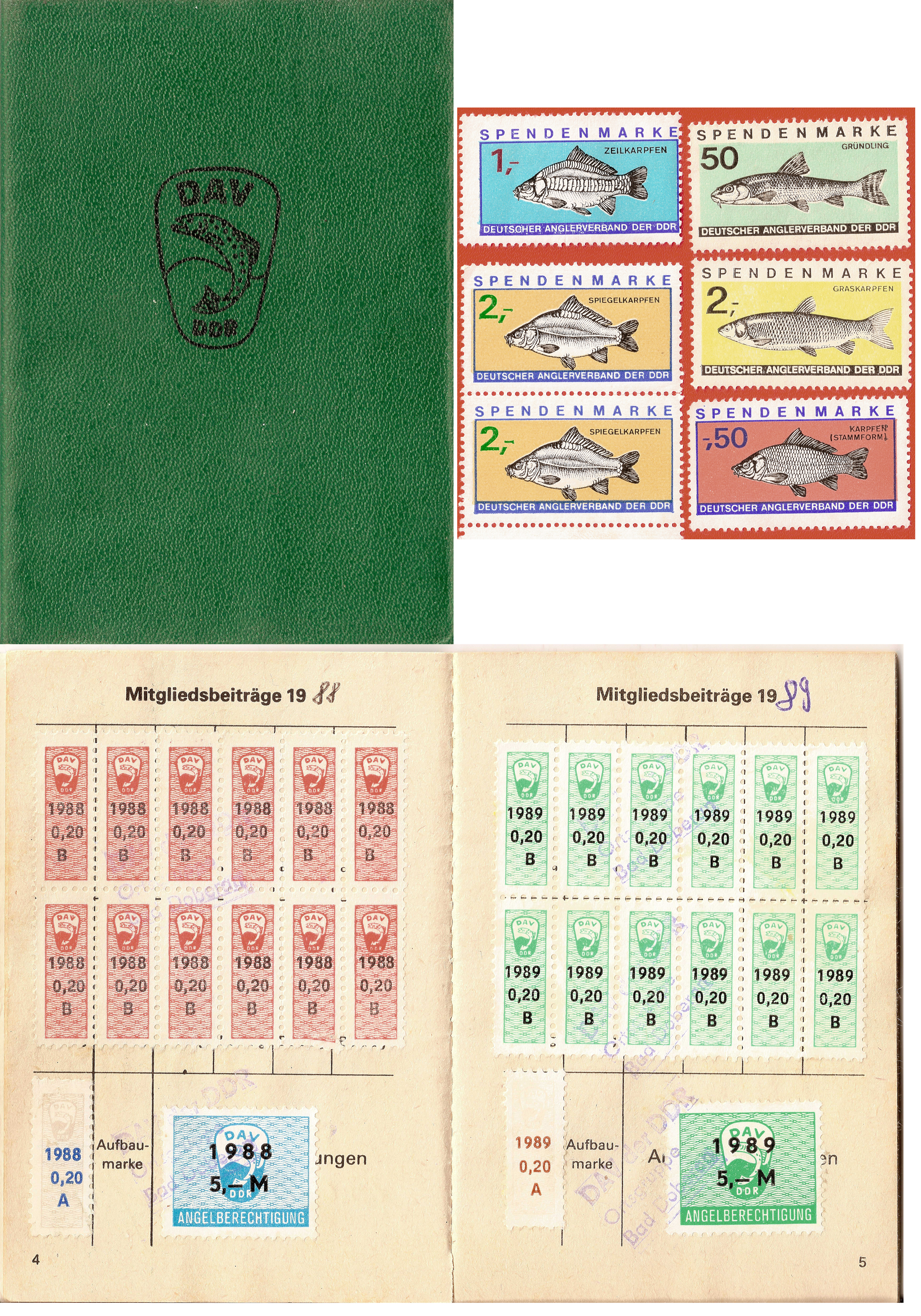
Membership booklet of the DAV from the late 1980s

The Deutscher Anglerverband (DAV) was an association of anglers in Germany that existed from 1958 until 2013. Until German reunification in 1990, the DAV was the governing body for the sport of angling in East Germany and was a constituent organization within the Deutscher Turn- und Sportbund. After reunification the DAV expanded into the formerly West German states.

In 2013, the DAV merged with the Verband Deutscher Sportfischer (VDSF) to form the Deutscher Angelfischerverband, thus uniting the two main angling organizations in the country.
