= Deutscher Fecht-Verband =

East German governing body of archery

German Fencing Association
- Deutscher Fecht-Verband
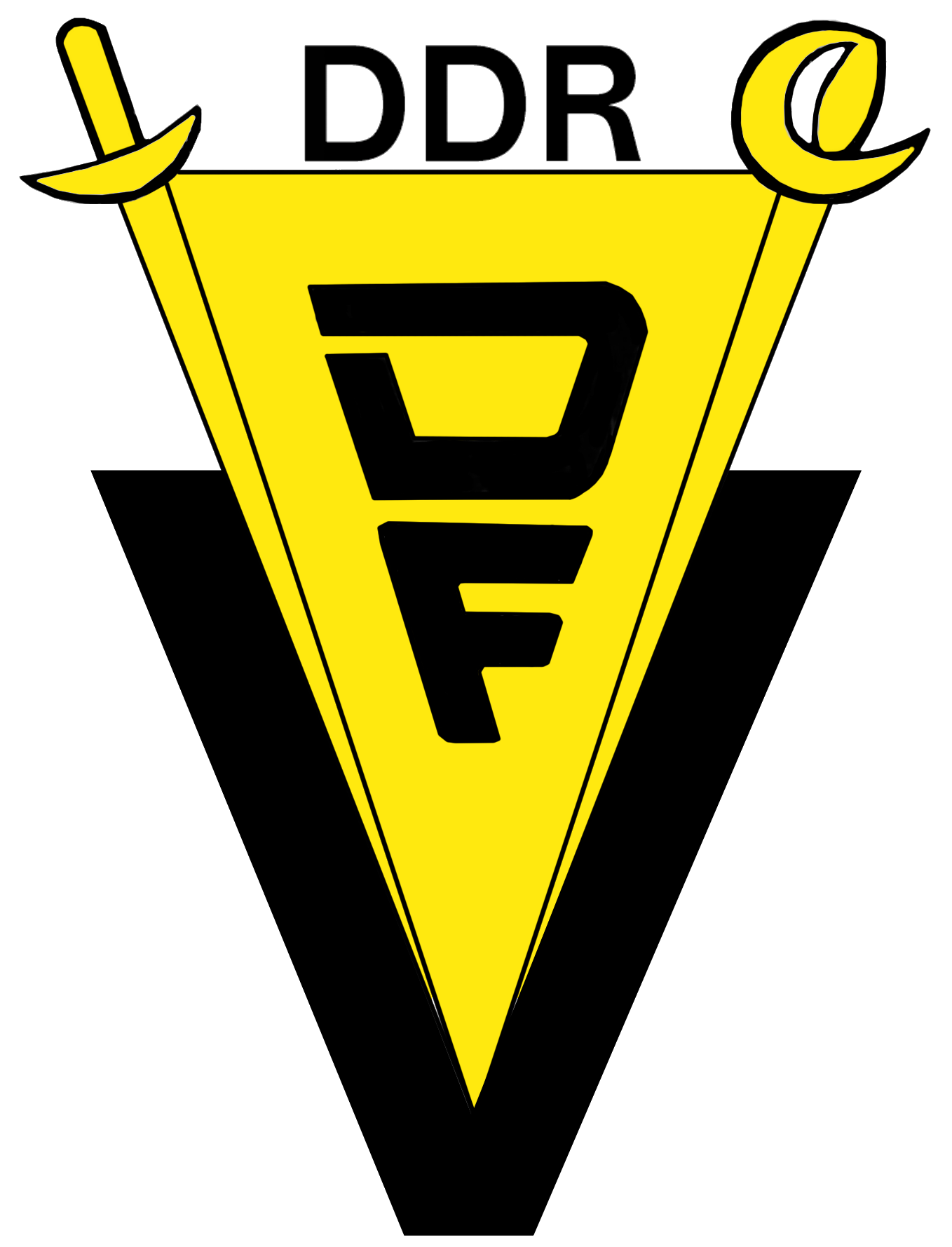
- Sport: Fencing
- Membership: 6,584 (1988)
- Abbreviation: DFV
- Founded: 20 July 1958
- Headquarters: East Berlin, German Democratic Republic
- Closure date: 8 December 1990
- (East Germany)

The Deutscher Fecht-Verband (DFV) was the organ of the larger Deutscher Turn- und Sportbund responsible for governing the sport of fencing in East Germany. One of the smaller sports associations in the nation, in 1988 the organization had 6,584 registered athletes and 673 trainers. After German reunification in late 1990 the DFV was absorbed by the German Fencing Federation (DFB).

Though its membership was comparatively small, the DFV produced several prominent athletes, including Olympians Udo Wagner, Mandy Niklaus, and Klaus Haertter.

== Presidents of the DFV ==
Alfred Röll	1958–1960
Rudi Hansen	1960–1970
Rolf Borrmann	1970–1990

== See also ==
- Deutscher Turn- und Sportbund
- Sports associations (East Germany)
