= Deutscher Schwimmsport-Verband =

East German swimming organisation

German Swimming Association
- Deutscher Schwimmsport-Verband
- Sport: Swimming
- Membership: 83,509 (1988)
- Abbreviation: DSSV
- Founded: 4 May 1958
- Headquarters: East Berlin, German Democratic Republic
- Closure date: 30 November 1990
- (East Germany)

The Deutscher Schwimmsport-Verband (DSSV) was the governing body for swim sports in East Germany (GDR). It was an organ of the larger Deutscher Turn- und Sportbund, which was a mass organization that oversaw all sports associations in the GDR. In 1988 the organization had 83,509 registered athletes and 6,911 trainers. Shortly after German reunification the remnants of the DSSV were absorbed by the various swimming associations of the West German states.
