= 1994 Lake Constance Cessna 425 crash =

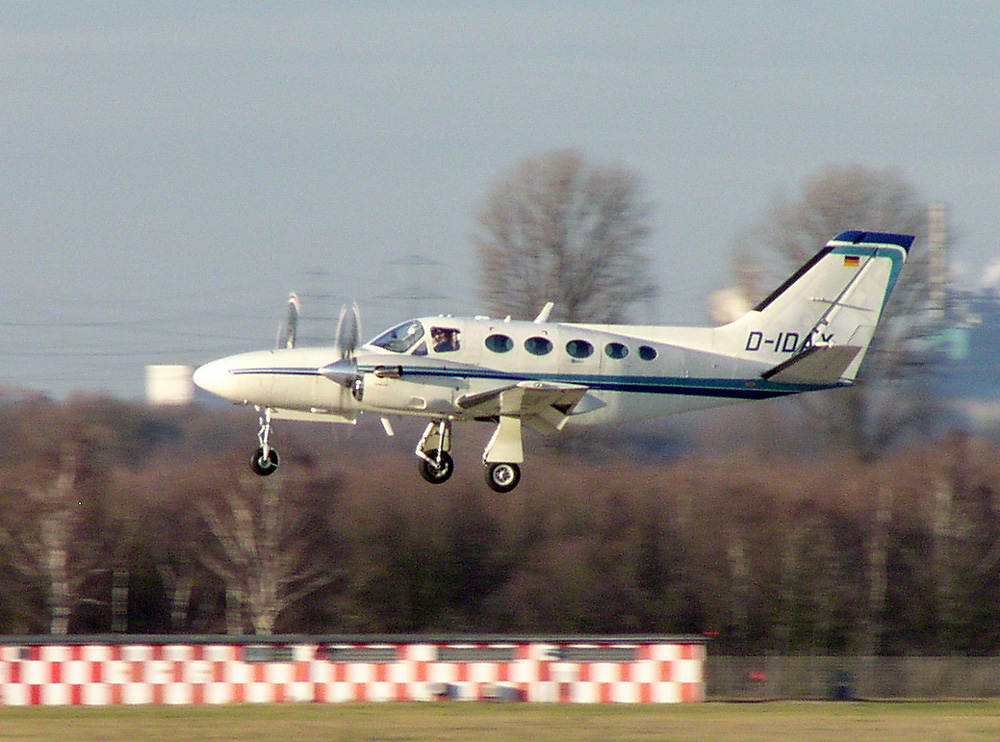
- A Cessna 425 similar to the accident aircraft

Accident
- Date: 24 January 1994
- Site: Lake Constance, north of Rorschach, Switzerland; 47°29′33.79″N 9°29′35.58″E

Aircraft
- Aircraft type: Cessna 425
- Flight origin: Prague Ruzyne
- Destination: St. Gallen Altenrhein
- Passengers: 4
- Crew: 1
- Fatalities: 3
- Missing: 2
- Survivors: 0

On 24 January 1994 a Cessna 425 crashed into Lake Constance with 5 people on board. 3 of them are confirmed killed, two are missing. The crash caused significant media attention due to a suspicion the aircraft might be transporting nuclear material which was later found untrue.

== The flight ==
The flight left Prague Ruzyne earlier that day with final destination Paris and an intermediate stop in St. Gallen Altenrhein. On board were pilot Rudi Wierschem, businessmen Josef Rimmele and Klaus Eichler (a former East German official), as well as two barmaids. Mr Rimmele had an outstanding arrest warrant by German authorities for tax evasion and fraud.

== Accident ==
In the evening of 24 January, an aircraft was reported missing just north of the Swiss city of Rorschach, above Lake Constance a few miles west of the airport of St. Gallen Altenrhein. Initial attempts to locate the aircraft in the lake had been delayed due to deteriorating weather. The aircraft was lifted from the lake on 8 February 1994. Analysis at the time was inconclusive as the flaps were in neutral position which was unexpected for a planned landing at the nearby airport or an intentional watering. One of the aircraft doors was found open with only 3 of the 5 expected passengers on board. The pilot, one of the barmaids and a dog have not been recovered.

=== Legal significance ===
The case was discussed in the 1995 edition of the commentary to the Constitution of Bavaria. The authors concluded that lack of clarity of the border line in the lake would have resulted in ambiguity about which country's criminal courts would have had jurisdiction.

== Nuclear scare ==
During the time between the crash at the end of January and its recovery in early February, the biography of the business men on board caused for significant media attention and a scare that the aircraft might be transporting nuclear material. After recovery of the aircraft, no nuclear material was found. Had this been found to be true, the water supply in Switzerland, Germany and Austria and some important population centres along the river Rhine might have been at risk, hence the focus of attention.

Mr Rimmele and Mr Eichler are said to have been under observation by authorities given their connection with Eastern European arms dealers and activities which included the sale and transport of low radioactive material in the past to Chinese buyers.
