= Cessna 425 =

Pressurized twin turboprop airplane produced 1980–1986

Cessna 425 Corsair/Conquest I
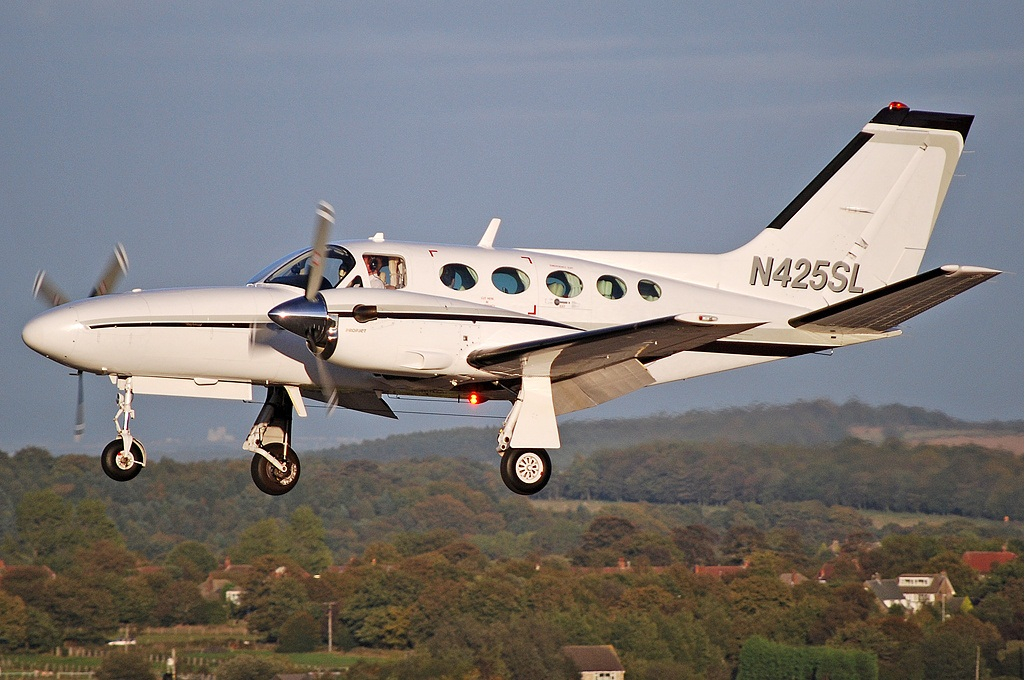
- Cessna 425 Conquest I

General information
- Type: Utility monoplane
- National origin: United States
- Manufacturer: Cessna
- Number built: 236

History
- Manufactured: November 1980–1986
- First flight: September 12, 1978
- Developed from: Cessna 421

The Cessna 425, known as the Corsair and later as the Conquest I, is an eight-seat American pressurized turboprop twin-engined light aircraft. Now out of production, it was built by Cessna Aircraft of Wichita, Kansas, between 1980 and 1986.

== Design and development ==
The 425 was introduced as a competitor to the Beechcraft King Air. The 425 was introduced in 1980 and was a derivation of the Cessna 421, powered by two 450 hp (336 kW) Pratt & Whitney PT6 engines. In comparison to the King Air C90, "the result was an $875,000 pressurized twin-turboprop that could fly 15 knots to 20 knots faster than the C90, cruise 250 miles farther with four passengers aboard and burn 15-percent less fuel ... it also costs $200,000 less to buy."

The 425 was very easy to fly and was noted by reviewers for its spacious cabin with large windows for good visibility and comfortable seats.

The original Corsair was developed into the Conquest I by customer demand for more cabin space and a higher maximum takeoff weight. Cessna worked on upgrades that would allow more cabin space and passengers. Essentially, the upgrades increased maximum takeoff weight. The Cessna 441 had previously been called the Conquest but was renamed the Conquest II. Earlier model Corsairs can be upgraded to the Conquest I standard with factory-provided modification kits.

Due to economic conditions in general aviation, sales decreased in the mid-1980s, and production of the 425 ended in 1986.

== Accidents and incidents ==
- On 24 January 1994, a Cessna 425 crashed into Lake Constance at Rorschach during its approach to the airport, killing all 5 people on board.

== Specifications (Cessna 425 - 1982 Corsair) ==
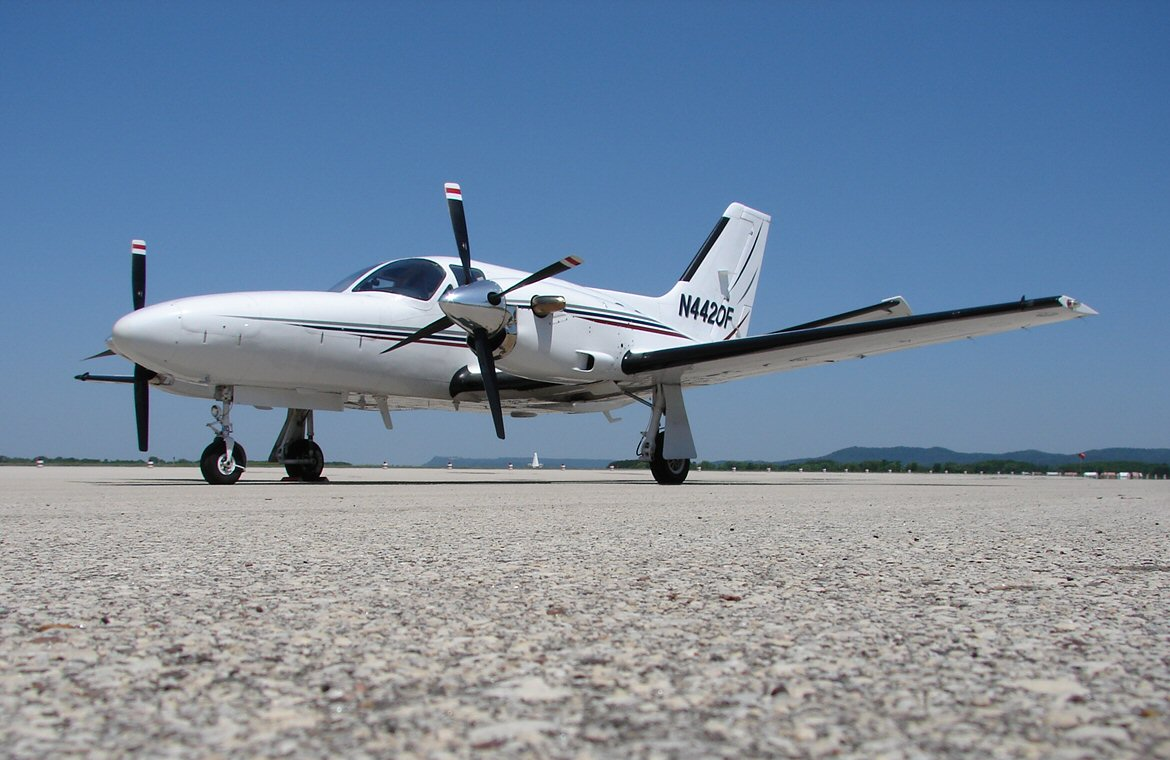
Cessna 425 Conquest I

Data from Jane's All the World's Aircraft 1982–83

General characteristics

- Crew: two pilots
- Capacity: four–six passengers
- Length: 35 ft 10 1/4 in (10.93 m)
- Wingspan: 44 ft 1 1/2 in (13.45 m)
- Height: 12 ft 7 1/4 in (3.84 m)
- Wing area: 224.98 sq ft (20.901 m^{2})
- Airfoil: NACA 23018-63 (mod) at root, NACA 23009-63 at tip
- Empty weight: 4,915 lb (2,229 kg)
- Max takeoff weight: 8,200 lb (3,719 kg)
- Fuel capacity: 366 US gal (305 imp gal; 1,390 L) usable capacity
- Powerplant: 2 × Pratt & Whitney Canada PT6A-112 turboprops, 450 shp (340 kW) each
- Propellers: 3-bladed Hartzell 9910438-1 or McCauley 9910535-1 constant-speed propellers

Performance

- Maximum speed: 264 kn (304 mph, 489 km/h) at 17,700 ft (5,400 m)
- Cruise speed: 210 kn (240 mph, 390 km/h) at 30,000 ft (9,100 m), econ cruise
- Stall speed: 79 kn (91 mph, 146 km/h) (CAS), flaps and undercarriage down, engines idling
- Range: 1,646 nmi (1,894 mi, 3,048 km) at 30,000 ft (9,100 m), econ cruise, 45 min reserves
- Service ceiling: 34,700 ft (10,600 m)
- Rate of climb: 2,027 ft/min (10.30 m/s)
- Takeoff run to 50 ft (15m): 2,431 ft (741 m)
- Landing run from 50 ft (15 m): 2,145 ft (654 m)

== See also ==
Related development

- Cessna 421

Aircraft of comparable role, configuration, and era

- Beechcraft King Air
- Mitsubishi MU-2
- Piper PA-31T Cheyenne
