= Deutscher Tischtennis-Verband =

East German table tennis organisation

German Table Tennis Association
- Deutscher Tischtennis-Verband

- Sport: Table tennis
- Membership: 138,460 (1988)
- Abbreviation: DTTV
- Founded: 4 April 1958
- Headquarters: East Berlin, German Democratic Republic
- Closure date: 2 December 1990
- (East Germany)

The Deutscher Tischtennis-Verband (DTTV) was the governing body for table tennis in the German Democratic Republic. It was a constituent sports association within the larger Deutscher Turn- und Sportbund, which was the primary sports authority in the country and a part of the National Front. Shortly after German reunification in 1990, the DTTV was absorbed by the German Table Tennis Association (DTTB).

== See also ==
- Deutscher Turn- und Sportbund
- Sports associations (East Germany)
