= Bernd Pansold =

- Born: April 3, 1942 (age 84); Zwickau, Nazi Germany
- Occupation: Physician

Bernd Pansold (born 3 April 1942 in Zwickau) is a German doctor and practitioner of sports medicine. From 1968 to 1990 he was the team doctor of East German sports club SC Dynamo Berlin, and from 1971 was an unofficial member of the East German Ministry for State Security (Stasi) under the alias Jürgen Wendt. After the reunification of Germany, Pansold worked for Austrian Sports Centre in Obertauern as the medic for all winter sports athletes. In 1998 Pansold was convicted by the Landgericht Berlin for the doping of underage persons in nine cases, which led to a fine; Pansold was then released by the Austrian Ski Association (ÖSV) from his position. Since 2003 Bernd Pansold has been active working for Red Bull GmbH as the director of the company's own Diagnostic- and Training center, in which professional athletes associated with the company Red Bull are attended to.

== Activity in East Germany ==
Bernd Pansold was hired in 1968 from the Stasi supported sports club and only four years later was promoted to deputy head of performance medicine. In 1982, he became the head of the Dynamo sports medicine. In his function Pansold was responsible for various doping practices. In 1975, he was responsible for the distribution of recipes for doping products to doctors who were under his guidance. The former East German national swimmer, victim of his practices and current sportsjournalist Raik Hannemann later described: "He was the chief methodologist at Dynamo, not only for swimming, but also other sports and always involving doping. Dynamo were exempt from the police and the Stasi under the regime. Under his rule the other team doctors of lower rank would follow in a militant fashion. He is the main culprit for doping in Berlin sports, especially at Dynamo.

According to former secret Stasi documents and testaments of witnesses regarding Pansold, he had been involved in the creation of the State lead doping program in the early seventies. The application of anabolic steroids as well as Pansolds involvement in the research group "Zusätzliche Leistungsreserve" (English: additional performance reserve) at the Forschungsinstitut für Körperkultur und Sport (FKS) in 1975 had come to light, in which the enhancement and optimization of anabolic doping was intended. In that same year Pansold himself reported in one of his IM-reports titled "flächendeckende Anwendung anaboler Steroide an Teilnehmer der Zentralen Kinder- und Jugendspartakiade" (English: Widespread use of anabolic steroids to participants of the Central Children's and Youth sports divisions). There are several more recollections and reports of his self composed reports about training- and competition doping at World championships and Olympic games, amongst others such products as the State sponsored VEB Jenapharm produced sexual hormone Testosterone as well as Amphetamines such as Pervitin, which were distributed to female athletes as well. In some parts of his IM-reports Pansold even reports that those involved were aware of their "criminal acts" and of the long term consequences to health of the subjects, which was already noticeable upon consumption.

In regards to the work-up of State sponsored doping in East Germany and several complaints of affected athletes, who were often treated to such drugs without their own knowing, Pansold was one of six involved doctors who were accused in a process in the 34 Criminal Court of Berlin, accused of the facilitation of assaulting minors. Unlike his fellow doctors Pansold remained silent during the procedure regarding the allegations against him. The chamber found Pansold as proven guilty, according to his own accounts in his report "Controlling the allocation of virile enhancing strong anabolic steroids to underage swimmers at Dynamo, and there were no milder circumstances to be seen. Pansold was sentenced to a money fine and his plea for a revision to the Federal Court was denied in February 2000.

== Activity in Austria ==
=== Performance center Obertauern ===
After the reunification of Germany, Pansold migrated to Austria along with several of his former colleagues, which soon became known as the "country of refuge for the DDR doping doctors". Here he opened a practice in Vienna, on top of being employed by a federal and state sponsored sports centre modelled after German Olympic training centres in Obertauern. At this sports centre, Pansold, who was becoming known as a good performance diagnostician, supervised several known top-flight Austrian Winter athletes. Austrian alpine star skier Hermann Maier was a regular at his practice, and the doping allegations which surfaced in 1998 from competitors and the media in his breakthrough year, were largely due to his association with Pansold. Maier however denied ever having close contact to Pansold. The following nationwide attention to Pansolds past involvement with doping, enhanced by the ongoing court cases in Germany, put athletes and officials of Austrian winter-sports under immense pressure, since they were now being accused of working closely with Pansold. ÖSV-President Peter Schröcksnadel publicly disputed ever to have worked with Pansold. In 1998 the ÖSV then made their utility of the Performance center Obertauern dependent on the dismissal of Pansold, which followed shortly thereafter. The media however accused the ÖSV of not taking necessary action until sufficient public attention was brought to the matter.

=== Red Bull performance center in Thalgau ===
Following his dismissal in Obertauern, Pansold continued to work from his practice in Vienna, who was occasionally invited to conferences and lectures, in which he sometimes claimed that the performance of professional athletes had only reached 50% of their potential in today's sports. In 2008, he was hired by soft drink manufacturer Red Bull, whose founder and owner Dietrich Mateschitz had recently begun to sponsor sport clubs and athletes in a major way. Pansold then became the leader of the companies own "Diagnostic- and Training center " open to all athletes who are sponsored by Red Bull. When the company was critically questioned about the hiring of Pansold, the company stated that Pansold was one of the world's leading performance diagnostician and sports doctors, and that Dr. Pansold was unchallenged in his correctness and integrity according to his medicinal circles and the Red Bull staff and athletes. Pansold himself added that doping was a thing of the past from the time of the Cold War. Mateschitz himself also expressed that he felt as though what Pansold was involved with in East Germany was a thing of the past.

Since it became known that Red Bull and Pansold were working together, there has been harsh criticism raised against the company. In 2011 the German publication "Der Tagesspiegel" even accused the company of being too secretive regarding their involvement with Pansold, stating that the company were reluctant to share details on how and to what extent the collaboration with Pansold was. The Süddeutsche Zeitung concluded, after a meeting of journalists with Pansold in Thalgau where he refused to answer questions regarding his past, that there are former athletes of the DDR, who are either sick today or who have had disabled children, due to the pills they were given by Pansold in their youth, and that you cannot hold it against them that they find it harsh and cynical that Pansold continues to be allowed to happily continue in his career as a doctor considering their condition.

It is noteworthy that several notable athletes attend the diagnostics and training centre to different degrees, to be treated or advised, such as German sports stars Maria Riesch and Sebastian Vettel, who however dispute and deny having ever had any contact with Pansold who is the leader of the operation. A possible collaboration between American Alpine skier Lindsey Vonn and Pansold is also a reoccurring theme in German media. Pansold's role at the Red Bull facility was not reported in the United States until 2013, when Pansold confirmed in an interview with the New York Daily News that Vonn had visited him in Thalgau, though Vonn's publicist said they exchanged "nothing more than a courtesy hello."

== Bibliography ==
- (in German), Doping in der DDR. Ein historischer Überblick zu einer konspirativen Praxis. Genese – Verantwortung – Gefahren., Sport und Buch Strauß, Cologne 2002, ISBN 3-89001-315-5
- (in German) Klaus Blume, Die Dopingrepublik: Eine (deutsch-)deutsche Sportgeschichte, Rotbuch Verlag, Berlin, 2012, ISBN 978-3867891615
