= Manfred Höppner =

German sports doctor (1934–2023)

Manfred Höppner (16 April 1934 – 20 October 2023) was an East German physician who served as East Germany's top sports doctor. He and Manfred Ewald, the GDR's minister of sport (1961–1988) and president of the country's Olympic committee from 1973 to 1990, are considered the architects of the GDR's state-sponsored system of the illicit use of performance-enhancing drugs, believed to account for the GDR's Olympic successes between 1972 and 1988. Höppner allegedly had ties to the East German secret police, the Stasi. Born in Weinböhla, Germany on 16 April 1934, he died on 20 October 2023, at the age of 89.

== Doping scandal ==
On 18 July 2000, in Berlin, Höppner and Ewald were convicted as accessories to the intentional bodily harm of athletes, including minors. Both received probation. During the trial, Höppner testified that they had received approval from the highest levels of government. However, unlike his colleague, Höppner expressed remorse in his role and told the court, "I beg those athletes who suffered ill health to accept my apologies."
