= Deutscher Turn- und Sportbund =

German Gymnastics and Sports Federation

German Gymnastics and Sports Federation DTSB
- Deutscher Turn- und Sportbund

- Formation: April 1957
- Dissolved: 1990-91 (individual organizations within the DTSB continue to exist)
- Headquarters: East Berlin
- Location: East Germany
- Members: 3.700.000 (1989)

The Deutscher Turn- und Sportbund (DTSB; German Gymnastics and Sports Federation) was a mass organization of the German Democratic Republic from 1957 until shortly after German reunification. Membership in the organization included nearly four million people, which accounted for almost 20% of the population of the GDR.

== History ==
Founded in 1957, the DTSB was the last major mass organization to be created by the East German government, and was the central agency responsible for mass sport. The federation consisted of individual sports associations within the country, ranging from sailing to chess. While it worked in conjunction with the Gesellschaft für Sport und Technik, the DTSB focused more on adult activities, whereas the GST focused on youth activities. The DTSB worked closely with both the Free German Youth and the East German Olympic Committee and had representation in all levels of East German local and state government. The DTSB was charged with both organizing and financing all sporting and fitness activities, associations, and events in the nation, as well as promoting physical education among the masses. It had especially close ties with the ruling Socialist Unity Party and was also designed to promote socialist ideology through sport.

Upon the dissolution of East Germany and reunification with the West, the organization was deprived of funds and the individual sports associations either continued to exist independently or joined their Western counterparts. The DTSB eventually dissolved itself on 5 December 1990.

== Sports Associations of the DTSB ==
Name	Acronym	Sport	Founded	Number of athletes (1988)	Number of trainers (1988)
Allgemeiner Deutscher Motorsport Verband	ADMV	Motorsports	2 June 1957	85,134	5,064
Deutscher Anglerverband	DAV	Fishing	13 May 1958	527,696	10,942
Deutscher Basketball-Verband	DBV	Basketball	20 May 1958	14,644	1,243
Deutscher Billard-Sportverband	DBSV	Cue sports	13 March 1958	11,009	1,369
Deutscher Bogenschützen-Verband	DBSV	Archery	23 October 1959	4,668	545
Deutscher Box-Verband	DBV	Boxing	4 May 1958	20,908	1,868
Deutscher Eislauf-Verband	DELV	Ice sports	31 August 1958	8,995	631
Deutscher Faustball-Verband	DFV	Fistball	27 April 1958	10,779	1,345
Deutscher Fecht-Verband	DFV	Fencing	20 July 1958	6,584	673
Deutscher Federball-Verband	DFV	Badminton	11 January 1958	27,069	2,480
Deutscher Fußball-Verband	DFV	Football	17 May 1958	575,667	39,207
Deutscher Gewichtheber-Verband	DGV	Weightlifting	26 April 1958	25,630	2,465
Deutscher Handballverband	DHV	Handball	21 June 1958	152,975	13,225
Deutscher Hockey-Sportverband	DHSV	Hockey	19 April 1958	6,152	576
Deutscher Judo-Verband	DJV	Judo	19 April 1958	54,544	4,891
Deutscher Kanu-Sport-Verband	DKSV	Canoeing	19 April 1958	26,768	2,082
Deutscher Kegler-Verband	DKV	Bowling	30 March 1958	204,126	17,369
Deutscher Verband für Leichtathletik	DVfL	Athletics	17 May 1958	180,605	15,583
Deutscher Pferdesport-Verband	DPV	Equestrian sports	27 April 1961	53,818	5,951
Deutscher Radsport-Verband	DRV	Cycling	18 May 1958	27,226	2,816
Deutscher Ringer-Verband	DRV	Wrestling	26 April 1958	23,686	2,106
Deutscher Rollsport-Verband	DRV	Roller sports	12 October 1958	4,704	381
Deutscher Ruder-Sport-Verband	DRSV	Rowing	12 April 1958	14,275	1,103
Deutscher Rugby-Sportverband	DRSV	Rugby	20 April 1958	1,213	103
Deutscher Shachverband	DSV	Chess	27 April 1958	43,374	4,523
Deutscher Schlitten- und Bobsportverband	DSBV	Bobsleigh and Sled sports	28 September 1958	3,759	447
Deutscher Schwimmsport-Verband	DSSV	Swim sports	4 May 1958	83,509	6,911
Bund Deutscher Segler	BDS	Sailing	20 April 1958	31,318	2,231
Deutscher Skiläufer-Verband	DSLV	Ski sports	12 October 1958	48,438	4,100
Deutscher Tennis-Verband	DTV	Tennis	26 April 1958	47,274	3,185
Deutscher Tischtennis-Verband	DTTV	Table Tennis	4 April 1958	126,376	12,084
Deutscher Turn-Verband	DTV	Gymnastics	3 May 1958	408,476	26,542
Deutscher Verband für Versehrtensport	DVfV	Disabled sports	4 July 1959	14,080	1,249
Deutscher Sportverband Volleyball	DSVB	Volleyball	20 April 1958	134,924	12,454
Deutscher Verband für Wandern, Bergsteigen und Orientierungslauf	DWBO	Hiking, Mountaineering, and Orienteering	15 June 1958	86,123	6,844

== Presidents of the DTSB ==
Rudi Reichert	1957–1961
Manfred Ewald	1961–1988
Klaus Eichler	1988–1990
Martin Kilian	1990

== See also ==
- Sports associations (East Germany)
- National Front (East Germany)
- Gesellschaft für Sport und Technik
