= Doping in East Germany =

The government of the German Democratic Republic (GDR) conducted a decades-long program of coercive administration and distribution of performance-enhancing drugs, initially testosterone esters, later CDMT (sold under the brand name of Turinabol), to the country's elite athletes. The aim of the program, which began in the 1960s, was to bolster East Germany's state image and prestige by winning medals in international competition such as the Olympic Games. The system was extremely formalised and heavily based on secrecy. Scholars and athletes have noted the pervasiveness of operations, the secrecy surrounding them, and the extent of abuse that athletes suffered because of them. While doping brought East Germany impressive results in sporting events, it was often devastating to the health of the athletes involved.

The program has been described in numerous accounts by the athletes, and by the East German government's secret records opened in 1993 that revealed the scale of the program. Various performance-enhancing drugs first became available in 1966 for male athletes and 1968 for females. Beginning in 1974, doping became a blanket policy imposed by the GDR sports federation. Athletes were often sworn to secrecy, deceived, or simply not informed about the drugs they were taking. While virtually no East German athlete ever failed an official drug test, Stasi files show many produced positive results at the Kreischa laboratory (German:Zentrales Dopingkontroll-Labor des Sportmedizinischen Dienstes), a facility approved at the time by the IOC. Documents revealed state-sponsored programs involving hundreds of scientists carrying out doping research on thousands of athletes. Particular attention was paid to doping women and adolescent girls because they gained the greatest performance boost from doping. In addition to doping research, research on evading doping detection was carried out.

In the 1990s, a special division of the German criminal police, the Zentrale Ermittlungsstelle für Regierungs- und Vereinigungskriminalität (ZERV), was charged with investigating doping crimes. Many sports directors, club officials, and some athletes were charged. For example, two former Dynamo Berlin club doctors were convicted of administering hormones to underage female athletes between 1975 and 1984. The East German Minister of Sport, Manfred Ewald, and the country's top sports doctor, Manfred Höppner, were convicted as accessories to "intentional bodily harm of athletes, including minors." More recently, former East German athletes who were administered drugs and suffered adverse effects have been able to seek financial compensation. Scholars have referred to the damaging side effects of steroid consumption to highlight that the GDR's regime was abusive and corrupt.

The program allowed East Germany to consistently score near the top of the Olympic medal rankings, placing second overall in both 1976 and 1980. These results were used in propaganda, claiming that a country of merely 17–18 million had managed to defeat world powers through talent and hard work. When the scale of the doping was revealed, the United States and Great Britain appealed to the IOC for the redistribution of medals. However, the IOC executive board announced that it had no intention of revising the Olympic record books. In rejecting the petitions, the IOC made it clear that it wanted to discourage any such appeals in the future.

== History ==
=== Sports as a tool to gain legitimacy ===
After the building of the Berlin Wall, the East German government wanted to gain international recognition. High-level sports was targeted by as a possible tool to achieve it. Manfred Ewald, who became minister of Sports in 1961, initiated the doping system. The first and major sports reform adopted by the government was the 1969 high-performance directive called Leistungssportbeschluss. The aim of the reform was the division of disciplines into two main categories, Sport 1 and Sport 2. Disciplines stamped Sport 1 were supported and developed by the state because such sports, including swimming, rowing, and track and field, had the potential for Olympic glory. Disciplines stamped Sport 2 on the other hand held no particular interest in the eyes of the state. Indeed, sports like karate offered no potential for Olympic glory, and many suffered from the directive as resources were shifted away to finance Sport 1 disciplines.

The GDR made huge efforts to identify talented athletes. Most children competed in youth sport centers and were scouted by the government; the best prospects were selected for intense Olympic training. These children were expected to deliver great victories, and the state was willing to use any means at its disposal to ensure such outcomes. Advances in medicine and science led to widespread use of steroids, amphetamines, human growth hormones and blood boosting behind the scenes in training centers for professional athletes. The Sportvereinigung Dynamo (English: Sport Club Dynamo) was particularly singled out as a center for doping in East Germany.

The 1970s marked the formalisation of the doping system. Although various performance-enhancing drugs became available in 1966 for male athletes and 1968 for females, formalisation occurred after the remarkable performance of East Germany in the 1972 Summer Olympics, in which the GDR placed third in the medal rankings. Thanks to its strengthened doping program, the East German state was able to claim that a country of merely 17–18 million had managed to defeat world powers through talent and hard work.

After 1972, the International Olympic Committee (IOC) improved doping detection. As a result, in 1974, the East German state created the unterstützende Mittel, also known as the "uM group". Working with cutting-edge research, uM's goals were to improve the effects of doping and prevent any exposure of doping. Anabolic drugs became commonly available and East German athletes began consuming them frequently. Predominant amongst these drugs were anabolic-androgenic steroids, such as Oral Turinabol, which was produced by state-owned pharmaceuticals firm Jenapharm.

In the following years, the country managed to assert dominance over different disciplines, and multiple records were set by East German athletes. The 1980s gradually brought a climate of suspicion around the athletes. The IOC, which had begun to have doubts over their performance, reinforced doping controls as suspicion grew ever stronger. However, its investigations were severely hampered by a lack of tools and expertise.

The East German doping system ended in the 1990s with the fall of the Berlin Wall. Multiple athletes and individuals came forward with information on the doping system, and a series of trials were held for the principle figures involved. Approximately 1,000 people were invited to testify in the trials, and 300 did so.

=== Systematic state doping ===
Jean-Pierre de Mondenard, an expert in performance-enhancing drugs, contended that while doping existed in other countries, both communist and capitalist, the difference in East Germany was that it represented state policy.

From 1974 on, Manfred Ewald, head of the GDR sports federation, imposed blanket doping. That year, a "highly centralized, clandestine program" called State Research Plan 14.25 was created, and the uM working group (abbreviation of unterstützende Mittel, or 'supportive means'/'supportive substances') began overseeing distribution of drugs to athletes across all sports. The person in charge of the doping system was Dr. Manfred Höppner, a recognised East German sports doctor. He was made head of the uM group, which delivered the drugs to the federations. Each federation had its distinct uM group, as variety and doses differed with each discipline.

Scholars and athletes have noted the pervasiveness of uM working group operations, the secrecy surrounding them, and the extent of abuse that athletes suffered because of them. The state research program was "clandestine activity that demanded the collaboration of sports physicians, talented scientists and coaching experts under the watchful eye of the GDR Government". The well-documented involvement of the GDR's Ministry of State Security (Stasi) in the doping program highlights the lengths to which the state went to ensure its secrecy. Athletes were often sworn to secrecy, deceived, or simply not informed about the drugs they were taking; they were told that they were being given "vitamins". Shot put athlete Birgit Boese was just twelve years old when she became part of the doping program. She was instructed by her coach not to tell anyone about the pills she was given, not even her parents. Ewald, the federation head, was quoted as having told coaches: "They're still so young and don't have to know everything."

=== Olympic success ===
At the time, East German athletic results constituted an immense success. Not until the 1964 Olympics in Tokyo had East Germans won more medals than their West German counterparts. Four years later, the 1968 Olympics in Mexico City hosted two separate German teams with a common flag and anthem, in which East German athletes surpassed the West German (FRG) medal count: the GDR, a country of 17 million, won nine gold medals. The performance was repeated on 'enemy territory' at the 1972 Olympics in Munich; subsequently, the GDR never fell below third in the unofficial ranking. In Munich, the total medal count was 20. In the 1976 Olympic Games, it doubled again to 40, making East Germany second in the medal count. The GDR would repeat the performance yet again four years later.

The total count by GDR participants at Winter and Summer Olympics from 1956 to 1988 amounted to 203 gold, 192 silver and 177 bronze medals; the GDR-only era from 1968 to 1988 returned 192 gold, 165 silver and 162 bronze. Doping significantly helped to achieve victories for the state, bringing the relatively small nation to prominence on the world stage.

=== Effects on athletes ===
While doping brought East Germany impressive results in sporting events, it was often devastating for the athletes involved:

"While figures cannot be precise, the state-inspired doping program affected perhaps as many as 10,000 athletes. Not only was cheating at the center of the program, but so was the abuse of the athletes' health. Female athletes, including adolescents, experienced virilisation symptoms, and possibly as many as 1,000 sportsmen and women suffered serious and lasting physical and psychological damage".

One such athlete, former swimmer Rica Reinisch, triple Olympic champion and world record-setter at the 1980 Moscow Olympics, subsequently suffered numerous miscarriages and recurring ovarian cysts.

Often, doping was carried out without the knowledge of the athletes, some of whom were as young as ten. However, heated debate surrounds the issue, with recognised figures such as Werner Franke arguing that doping can be qualified as a choice of the athletes.

Questions remain about the extent to which these drugs were solely responsible for the health issues that occurred; some athletes may have had pre-existing or hereditary conditions. However, numerous known potential side effects from steroid consumption include the increased risk of cardiovascular disease, liver problems, violent mood swings, extreme masculinising effects in females, and a clear link with certain forms of cancer. And health consequences of taking performing-enhancing drugs had been acknowledged since as early as 1963, when a coach from Leipzig, Johanna Sperling, sent a letter to her athletes warning them against doping.

=== Discovery ===
In 1977, East German shot-putter Ilona Slupianek, who weighed 93 kg (205 lb), tested positive for anabolic steroids at the European Cup meeting in Helsinki. At that point, the GDR government took over the Kreischa testing laboratory near Dresden, which was reputed to administer around 12,000 tests a year on East German athletes. None of them were penalised.

The International Amateur Athletics Federation (IAAF) suspended Slupianek for 12 months, a penalty that ended two days before the European championships in Prague. Contrary to what the IAAF had hoped, sending her home to East Germany allowed her to train unchecked with anabolic steroids, then compete for another gold medal, which she did indeed win.

After the Slupianek affair, East German athletes were secretly tested before they left the country. Those who tested positive were removed from international competition. Such withdrawals were usually temporary, intended not as punishment but protection from international sanctions for both athletes and East German teams.

East Germans, and later outside media, would usually be informed that such withdrawals were due to injury sustained during training. If the athlete was being doped in secret, their doctor would usually be ordered to fabricate a medical condition to justify the withdrawal. The justification was also given as such to the athlete. Results of East Germany's internal drug tests were never made public – almost nothing emerged from the East German sports schools and laboratories. A rare exception was the visit by American sports writer and former athlete Doug Gilbert of the Edmonton Sun, who wrote:

Dr (Heinz) Wuschech knows more about anabolic steroids than any doctor I have ever met, and yet he cannot discuss them openly any more than Geoff Capes or Mac Wilkins can openly discuss them in the current climate of amateur sports regulation. What I did learn in East Germany was that they feel there is little danger from anabolica, as they call it, when the athletes are kept on strictly monitored programmes. Although the extremely dangerous side-effects are admitted, they are statistically no more likely to occur than side-effects from the birth control pill. If, that is, programmes are constantly medically monitored regarding to dosage.

Other reports came from defecting East German athletes, fifteen of whom fled to the West between 1976 and 1979. One of these, ski-jumper Hans-Georg Aschenbach, said: "Long-distance skiers start having injections to their knees from the age 14 because of their intensive training." Aschenbach continued: "For every Olympic champion, there are at least 350 invalids. There are gymnasts among the girls who have to wear corsets from the age of 18 because their spine and their ligaments have become so worn... There are young people so worn out by the intensive training that they come out of it mentally blank [lessivés – washed out], which is even more painful than a deformed spine."

On 26 August 1993, well after the dissolution of the GDR, records were opened, revealing the scale of the Stasi's supervision of state doping of East German athletes from 1971 until reunification in 1990. While virtually no East German athlete ever failed an official drug test, Stasi files show many produced positive results at the Kreischa laboratory (German:Zentrales Dopingkontroll-Labor des Sportmedizinischen Dienstes), a facility approved at the time by the IOC. The site is now called the Institute of Doping Analysis and Sports Biochemistry (IDAS).

== Aftermath ==
=== Search for justice ===
Scholars have referred to the damaging side effects of steroid consumption to highlight that the GDR's regime was abusive and corrupt.

In the 1990s, a special division of the criminal police, the Central Investigations Office for Government and Reunification Crimes (ZERV), was charged with investigating doping crimes. Of the 1,000 athletes invited to testify by ZERV, only 300 actually did so. While the absence of 700 invited athletes suggests they may have wittingly played a role in the doping system and thus refused to testify, it is conceivable some did not want public exposure or did not feel they had suffered at the hands of the regime.

Many former doctors and athletes struggling with the side effects brought sports directors to court. Many former club officials of Sportsvereinigung Dynamo and some athletes found themselves charged after the dissolution of the GDR. Two former Dynamo Berlin club doctors, Dieter Binus, chief of the East German national women's swimmer team from 1976 to 1980, and Bernd Pansold, in charge of the sports medicine centre in East Berlin, were tried for allegedly supplying 19 teenagers with illegal substances. Binus was sentenced in August 1998 and Pansold in December the same year, after both were found guilty of administering hormones to underage female athletes from 1975 to 1984. Daniela Hunger and Andrea Pollack are former Sport Club Dynamo athletes who publicly came forward and admitted to doping, accusing their coaches. Manfred Ewald, who had imposed blanket doping in East Germany, was given a 22-month suspended sentence, to the outrage of victims.

Based on Pollack's admission, the United States Olympic Committee asked for the redistribution of gold medals won in the 1976 Summer Olympics. Despite court rulings in Germany on substantial claims of systematic doping by some East German swimmers, the IOC executive board announced that it had no intention of revising the Olympic record books. In rejecting the American petition on behalf of its women's medley relay team in Montreal and a similar petition from the British Olympic Association on behalf of Sharron Davies, the IOC made it clear that it wanted to discourage any such appeals in the future.

More recently, former East German athletes who were administered drugs and suffered adverse effects have been able to seek financial compensation. The doping-opfer-file organisation, which fights for the recognition of East German athletes as victims of doping, scored its first success when the German government awarded 10.5 million euros to the athletes in 2016.

On 28 June 2016, the German Bundestag passed the Second Doping Victims Assistance Act, establishing a 13.65 million euro fund to provide financial assistance to victims of doping in the former GDR. The act defines such athletes as victims who may be entitled to financial assistance if they have suffered significant health damage.

=== Documentation ===
In 1991, Brigitte Berendonk and Werner Franke, two opponents of doping, published several theses which had been drafted by former researchers in the GDR's Bad Saarow Military Medical Academy. Top-secret research documents and government reports obtained after the fall of the GDR revealed vast state-sponsored programs involving hundreds of scientists carrying out doping research on thousands of athletes. Particular attention was paid to doping women and adolescent girls because they gained the greatest performance boost from doping. In addition to doping research, research on evading doping detection was carried out.

Berendonk and Franke were able to document the state-run doping program, which included numerous renowned athletes such as Marita Koch and Heike Drechsler. Both denied the allegations, but Berendonk won a 1993 lawsuit in which Drechsler accused her of lying.

== Significant cases ==
=== Renate Neufeld ===
In 1977, one of East Germany's best sprinters, Renate Neufeld, fled to the West with the Bulgarian she later married. A year later, she said that she had been told to take drugs supplied by coaches while training to represent East Germany in the 1980 Olympic Games.

At 17, I joined the East Berlin Sports Institute. My speciality was the 80m hurdles. We swore that we would never speak to anyone about our training methods, including our parents. The training was very hard. We were all watched. We signed a register each time we left for dormitory and we had to say where we were going and what time we would return. One day, my trainer, Günter Clam, advised me to take pills to improve my performance: I was running 200m in 24 seconds. My trainer told me the pills were vitamins, but I soon had cramps in my legs, my voice became gruff and sometimes I couldn't talk any more. Then I started to grow a moustache and my periods stopped. I then refused to take these pills. One morning in October 1977, the secret police took me at 7am and questioned me about my refusal to take pills prescribed by the trainer. I then decided to flee, with my fiancé.

When she defected to the West, Neufeld brought with her grey tablets and some green powder she said had been given to her, to members of her club, and to other athletes. West German doping analyst Manfred Donike reportedly identified them as anabolic steroids. Neufeld said she had stayed quiet for a year for the sake of her family back in East Germany. But when her father then lost his job and her sister was expelled from her handball club, she decided to tell her story.

=== Andreas Krieger ===
Andreas Krieger, then known as Heidi Krieger, competed as a woman in the East German athletics team, winning the gold medal for shot put in the 1986 European Championships in Athletics.

From the age of 16 onward, Krieger was systematically doped with anabolic steroids, which have significant androgenic effects on the body. He had already harboured doubts about his gender identity, and the chemical changes resulting from steroid use further exacerbated them. In 1997, some years after retirement, Krieger underwent sex reassignment surgery and changed his name to Andreas.

At the trial of Manfred Ewald, leader of the East German sports program and president of East Germany's Olympic committee, and Manfred Hoeppner, East German medical director in Berlin in 2000, Krieger testified that the drugs he had been given had contributed to his trans-sexuality; he already had thoughts about it, but in his words the effects of the doping deprived him of the right to "find out for myself which sex I wanted to be."

=== Christian Schenk ===
Particular media attention and controversy surrounded former GDR decathlete Christian Schenk, whose case highlighted that not all athletes unwittingly took performance-enhancing drugs. Schenk admitted that he had knowingly used them, but suggested he would consider applying for compensation from the fund set up by the Second Doping Act because he now has severe depression and bipolar disorder. Although Schenk admitted in an interview that his illnesses might be hereditary, his conditions are also known side effects of performance-enhancing drugs. Given that Schenk ostensibly suffered health damage due to doping, debate centered on the extent to which he and other athletes with similar experiences should be regarded as victims of doping.

=== Jörg Sievers ===
Doping victim Jörg Sievers, a teenage swimmer from Magdeburg, was found dead on the bottom of a pool on 17 January 1973. Sievers had an enlarged heart, but his parents were told he had died of influenza, despite Sievers having received a vaccine for influenza a month prior. Sievers' parents believed regular anabolic steroid use had caused his death. After German reunification, an investigation by the public prosecutor's office ended without conclusion, stating "numerous pieces of the puzzle ... indicate that [Sievers] was a victim of the GDR's relentless competitive sports system", but that "whether Sievers also lost his life because of the merciless doping practices can no longer be reconstructed."

== See also ==
- East Germany national athletics team
