= Manfred Ewald =

German politician (1926–2002)

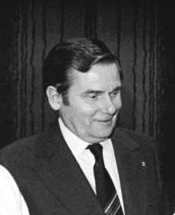
- Manfred Ewald, 1980

President of the National Olympic Committee of East Germany
- In office 1973–1990
- Preceded by: Heinz Schöbel
- Succeeded by: Günther Heinze

President of the German Gymnastics and Sports Federation
- In office 1961–1988
- Preceded by: Rudi Reichert
- Succeeded by: Klaus Eichler

Personal details
- Born: 17 May 1926 Podejuch, Weimar Germany (now part of Szczecin, Poland)
- Died: 21 October 2002 (aged 76) Damsdorf, Germany
- Awards: Order of Karl Marx; Olympic Order; Patriotic Order of Merit

Manfred Ewald (17 May 1926 – 21 October 2002) served as German Democratic Republic's (GDR) Minister of Sport (1961–1988) and president of his country's Olympic committee (1973–1990). He was convicted for his role in the state-sponsored system of the use of illicit performance-enhancing drugs that increased East Germany's Olympic successes from 1972–1988.

== Life ==
Ewald was born in Podejuch, Province of Pomerania, Weimar Germany (now Podjuchy, Poland), he was a member of the Hitler Youth, the Nazi party and, after World War II, the Socialist Unity Party. He was captured by the Soviet Red Army in 1944.

He was awarded the Olympic Order by the International Olympic Committee (IOC) in 1983.

In 1985, as president of the National Olympic Committee of East Germany, Ewald authored a letter to the IOC for the 90th IOC session being held in East Berlin that year.

Ewald defended his role in sports doping in his 1994 book, Ich war der Sport.

== Doping ==
On 18 July 2000, in Berlin, Ewald and Dr. Manfred Höppner, East Germany's top sports doctor, were convicted as accessories to "intentional bodily harm of athletes, including minors." Both received probation. During the trial, Höppner testified that they had received approval from the highest level of government.
