= List of members of the Secretariat of the Central Committee of the SED =

Secretaries of the SED Central Committee

The List of members of the Secretariat of the Central Committee of the Socialist Unity Party of Germany (SED) gives an overview of the secretaries and their areas of responsibility. Central Committee secretaries had the authority to give instructions to state ministers.

== January 1949 ==
Elected at the 16th meeting of the Party Executive:

- Edith Baumann
  - Women's Secretariat of the Central Committee
- Franz Dahlem
  - KPD Working Office in the Central Committee
  - West Department of the Central Committee
- Fred Oelßner
  - Propaganda Department of the Central Committee
  - Science Department of the Central Committee
  - Culture Department of the Central Committee
  - Institute for Marxism–Leninism at the Central Committee
  - "Karl Marx" Party Academy
- Paul Wessel (until February 1950)
  - Economic Policy Department of the Central Committee (from October 1949)
  - Health Policy Department of the Central Committee
- Walter Ulbricht
  - Cadre Affairs Department of the Central Committee
  - Security Affairs Department of the Central Committee
  - State and Legal Affairs Department of the Central Committee
  - Church Affairs Department of the Central Committee
  - Economic Policy Department of the Central Committee (until October 1949)
- Alexander Abusch (from March 1950)

== July 1950 ==
Elected at the 3rd Party Congress of the SED:

- Hermann Axen
  - Mass Agitation and Press Department of the Central Committee
  - Foreign Information Department of the Central Committee
- Edith Baumann
  - Women's Secretariat of the Central Committee (until December 1952, integrated into new Leading Party Organs and Mass Organizations Department)
  - Financial Administration and Party Businesses Department of the Central Committee
  - Neuer Weg
- Franz Dahlem (until 1952)
  - KPD Working Office in the Central Committee (until 1952)
  - West Department of the Central Committee (until 1952)
- Adalbert Hengst (from September 1952)
  - Economic Policy Department of the Central Committee (from September 1952)
- Hans Lauter (until May 1953)
  - Culture Department of the Central Committee
- Fred Oelßner
  - Propaganda Department of the Central Committee
  - Science Department of the Central Committee
  - Institute for Marxism–Leninism at the Central Committee
  - "Karl Marx" Party Academy
  - Academy for Social Sciences at the Central Committee (from 21 December 1951)
  - Einheit
- Karl Schirdewan (from December 1952)
  - Leading Party Organs and Mass Organizations Department of the Central Committee (from December 1952)
- Otto Schön
  - Organization Instructor Department of the Central Committee (until December 1952, integrated into new Leading Party Organs and Mass Organizations Department)
- Willi Stoph
  - Economic Policy Department of the Central Committee
  - Trade and Supply Department of the Central Committee (until 1952)
  - Health Policy Department of the Central Committee (until 1952)
- Walter Ulbricht
  - General Secretary of the Central Committee
  - Cadre Affairs Department of the Central Committee
  - International Relations Department of the Central Committee
  - Security Affairs Department of the Central Committee
  - State and Legal Affairs Department of the Central Committee
  - Church Affairs Department of the Central Committee
  - KPD Working Office in the Central Committee (from 1952)
  - West Department of the Central Committee (from 1952)
- Paul Verner
- Kurt Vieweg
  - Agriculture Department of the Central Committee
- Herbert Warnke

== July 1953 ==
Elected at the 15th Plenum of the Central Committee

- Erich Mückenberger
  - Agriculture Department of the Central Committee
- Fred Oelßner
  - Agitation Department of the Central Committee
  - Propaganda Department of the Central Committee
  - Science Department of the Central Committee
  - Institute for Marxism–Leninism at the Central Committee
  - "Karl Marx" Party Academy
  - Academy for Social Sciences at the Central Committee
- Karl Schirdewan
  - Leading Party Organs and Mass Organizations Department of the Central Committee
  - West Department of the Central Committee
  - KPD Working Office in the Central Committee
  - Youth Department of the Central Committee
  - Neuer Weg
- Walter Ulbricht
  - First Secretary of the Central Committee
  - Cadre Affairs Department of the Central Committee
  - International Relations Department of the Central Committee
  - Security Affairs Department of the Central Committee
  - State and Legal Affairs Department of the Central Committee
  - Church Affairs Department of the Central Committee
- Paul Wandel
  - Culture Department of the Central Committee
  - Public Education Department of the Central Committee
- Gerhart Ziller
  - Construction Department of the Central Committee
  - Research and Technical Development Department of the Central Committee
  - Health Policy Department of the Central Committee
  - Trade Unions and Social Policy Department of the Central Committee
  - Basic Industry Department of the Central Committee
  - Trade and Supply Department of the Central Committee
  - Light, Food and Bezirk-managed Industries Department of the Central Committee
  - Mechanical Engineering and Metallurgy Department of the Central Committee
  - Planning and Finance Department of the Central Committee
  - Transport and Communications Department of the Central Committee

== April 1954 ==
Elected at the 4th Party Congress of the SED:

- Paul Fröhlich (since 6 February 1958)
- Gerhard Grüneberg (since 6 February 1958)
  - State and Legal Affairs Department of the Central Committee
- Kurt Hager (since 15 April 1955)
  - Science Department of the Central Committee
  - Public Education Department of the Central Committee (from 1957)
  - Institute for Marxism–Leninism at the Central Committee (from 1957)
  - Academy for Social Sciences at the Central Committee (from 1958)
- Erich Honecker (since 6 February 1958)
  - Cadre Affairs Department of the Central Committee
  - Security Affairs Department of the Central Committee
  - Party Organs Department of the Central Committee
  - Youth Department of the Central Committee
  - Woman Department of the Central Committee
  - Sports Department of the Central Committee
- Erich Mückenberger
  - Agriculture Department of the Central Committee
- Alfred Neumann (since 1 February 1957)
  - Cadre Affairs Department of the Central Committee
  - Neuer Weg
- Albert Norden (since 15 April 1955)
  - Agitation Department of the Central Committee
  - Foreign Information Department of the Central Committee
  - "Karl Marx" Party Academy
- Fred Oelßner (until November 1955)
  - Agitation Department of the Central Committee
  - Propaganda Department of the Central Committee
  - Science Department of the Central Committee
  - Institute for Marxism–Leninism at the Central Committee
  - "Karl Marx" Party Academy
  - Academy for Social Sciences at the Central Committee
- Karl Schirdewan (until 6 February 1958)
  - Cadre Affairs Department of the Central Committee (from 1956)
  - Party Organs Department of the Central Committee
  - Youth Department of the Central Committee
  - Woman Department of the Central Committee
  - Neuer Weg (until 1955)
- Paul Verner (since 6 February 1958)
  - Church Affairs Department of the Central Committee
- Walter Ulbricht
  - First Secretary of the Central Committee
  - Cadre Affairs Department of the Central Committee (until 1956)
  - International Relations Department of the Central Committee
  - Security Affairs Department of the Central Committee (until 6 February 1958)
  - State and Legal Affairs Department of the Central Committee (until 6 February 1958)
  - Church Affairs Department of the Central Committee (until 6 February 1958)
  - Einheit (from 1956)
- Paul Wandel (until 19 October 1957)
  - Culture Department of the Central Committee
  - Public Education Department of the Central Committee
- Gerhart Ziller (died 14 December 1957)
  - Construction Department of the Central Committee
  - Research and Technical Development Department of the Central Committee
  - Trade Unions and Social Policy Department of the Central Committee
  - Basic Industry Department of the Central Committee
  - Trade and Supply Department of the Central Committee
  - Light, Food and Bezirk-managed Industries Department of the Central Committee
  - Mechanical Engineering and Metallurgy Department of the Central Committee
  - Planning and Finance Department of the Central Committee
  - Transport and Communications Department of the Central Committee

== July 1958 ==
Elected at the 5th Party Congress of the SED:

- Erich Apel (from 4 July 1961 to 28 June 1962)
  - Construction Department of the Central Committee
  - Research and Technical Development Department of the Central Committee
  - Trade Unions and Social Policy Department of the Central Committee
  - Basic Industry Department of the Central Committee
  - Mechanical Engineering and Metallurgy Department of the Central Committee
  - Planning and Finance Department of the Central Committee
  - Transport and Communications Department of the Central Committee
- Edith Baumann (from November 1961)
  - Trade and Supply Department of the Central Committee
  - Light, Food and Bezirk-managed Industries Department of the Central Committee
- Gerhard Grüneberg
  - Agriculture Department of the Central Committee (from 1961)
  - State and Legal Affairs Department of the Central Committee
- Kurt Hager
  - Science Department of the Central Committee
  - Public Education Department of the Central Committee
  - Institute for Marxism–Leninism at the Central Committee
  - Academy for Social Sciences at the Central Committee
- Erich Honecker
  - Cadre Affairs Department of the Central Committee
  - Security Affairs Department of the Central Committee
  - Party Organs Department of the Central Committee
  - Youth Department of the Central Committee
  - Woman Department of the Central Committee
  - Neuer Weg (from 1961)
- Günter Mittag (since 28 June 1962)
  - Construction Department of the Central Committee
  - Research and Technical Development Department of the Central Committee
  - Trade Unions and Social Policy Department of the Central Committee
  - Basic Industry Department of the Central Committee
  - Mechanical Engineering and Metallurgy Department of the Central Committee
  - Planning and Finance Department of the Central Committee
  - Transport and Communications Department of the Central Committee
- Erich Mückenberger (until 1961)
  - Agriculture Department of the Central Committee
- Alfred Neumann (until 1961)
  - Cadre Affairs Department of the Central Committee
  - Neuer Weg
- Albert Norden
  - Agitation Department of the Central Committee
  - Foreign Information Department of the Central Committee
  - "Karl Marx" Party Academy
  - West Department of the Central Committee of the Central Committee (since 1960)
- Walter Ulbricht
  - First Secretary of the Central Committee
  - International Relations Department of the Central Committee
- Paul Verner
  - Working Group on Church Issues of the Central Committee
  - Sports Department of the Central Committee

== January 1963 ==
Elected at the 6th Party Congress of the SED:

- Hermann Axen (since 15 February 1966)
  - International Relations Department of the Central Committee
- Gerhard Grüneberg
  - Agriculture Department of the Central Committee
  - State and Legal Affairs Department of the Central Committee
- Kurt Hager
  - Science Department of the Central Committee
  - Culture Department of the Central Committee
  - Public Education Department of the Central Committee
  - Institute for Marxism–Leninism at the Central Committee
  - Academy for Social Sciences at the Central Committee
  - Einheit
- Erich Honecker
  - Cadre Affairs Department of the Central Committee
  - Security Affairs Department of the Central Committee
  - Party Organs Department of the Central Committee
  - Youth Department of the Central Committee
  - Woman Department of the Central Committee
  - Neuer Weg
- Werner Jarowinsky (since 1 November 1963)
  - Trade and Supply Department of the Central Committee
- Günter Mittag
  - Construction Department of the Central Committee
  - Research and Technical Development Department of the Central Committee
  - Trade Unions and Social Policy Department of the Central Committee
  - Basic Industry Department of the Central Committee
  - Trade and Supply Department of the Central Committee (until 1 November 1963)
  - Light, Food and Bezirk-managed Industries Department of the Central Committee
  - Mechanical Engineering and Metallurgy Department of the Central Committee
  - Planning and Finance Department of the Central Committee
  - Transport and Communications Department of the Central Committee
- Albert Norden
  - Agitation Department of the Central Committee
  - Foreign Information Department of the Central Committee
  - West Department of the Central Committee of the Central Committee
  - "Karl Marx" Party Academy
- Walter Ulbricht
  - First Secretary of the Central Committee
  - International Relations Department of the Central Committee (until 15 February 1966)
- Paul Verner
  - Working Group on Church Issues of the Central Committee
  - Sports Department of the Central Committee

== April 1967 ==
Elected at the 7th Party Congress of the SED:

- Hermann Axen
  - International Relations Department of the Central Committee
- Gerhard Grüneberg
  - Agriculture Department of the Central Committee
  - State and Legal Affairs Department of the Central Committee
- Kurt Hager
  - Health Policy Department of the Central Committee
  - Science Department of the Central Committee
  - Culture Department of the Central Committee
  - Public Education Department of the Central Committee
  - Institute for Marxism–Leninism at the Central Committee
  - Academy for Social Sciences at the Central Committee
  - Einheit
- Erich Honecker
  - First Secretary of the Central Committee (since 3 May 1971)
  - Cadre Affairs Department of the Central Committee
  - Security Affairs Department of the Central Committee
  - Party Organs Department of the Central Committee
  - Youth Department of the Central Committee
  - Sports Department of the Central Committee
  - Woman Department of the Central Committee
  - Neuer Weg
- Werner Jarowinsky
  - Trade and Supply Department of the Central Committee
- Werner Lamberz
  - Agitation Department of the Central Committee
  - Propaganda Department of the Central Committee
  - "Karl Marx" Party Academy
- Günter Mittag
  - Construction Department of the Central Committee
  - Research and Technical Development Department of the Central Committee
  - Trade Unions and Social Policy Department of the Central Committee
  - Basic Industry Department of the Central Committee
  - Light, Food and Bezirk-managed Industries Department of the Central Committee
  - Mechanical Engineering and Metallurgy Department of the Central Committee
  - Planning and Finance Department of the Central Committee
  - Transport and Communications Department of the Central Committee
- Albert Norden
  - Foreign Information Department of the Central Committee
  - West Department of the Central Committee of the Central Committee
- Walter Ulbricht
  - First Secretary of the Central Committee (until 3 May 1971)
- Paul Verner
  - Working Group on Church Issues of the Central Committee

== June 1971 ==
Elected at the 8th Party Congress of the SED:

- Hermann Axen
  - General Department of the Central Committee (from May 1977)
  - International Relations Department of the Central Committee
- Horst Dohlus
  - Party Organs Department of the Central Committee (also department head)
- Gerhard Grüneberg
  - Agriculture Department of the Central Committee
- Kurt Hager
  - Health Policy Department of the Central Committee
  - Science Department of the Central Committee
  - Culture Department of the Central Committee
  - Public Education Department of the Central Committee
  - Institute for Marxism–Leninism at the Central Committee
  - Academy for Social Sciences at the Central Committee
  - Einheit
  - Dietz Publishing House
- Erich Honecker
  - First Secretary of the Central Committee
  - Cadre Affairs Department of the Central Committee
  - Security Affairs Department of the Central Committee
- Werner Jarowinsky
  - Trade and Supply Department of the Central Committee
- Werner Krolikowski (from 2 October 1973)
  - Construction Department of the Central Committee
  - Research and Technical Development Department of the Central Committee
  - Trade Unions and Social Policy Department of the Central Committee
  - Basic Industry Department of the Central Committee
  - Light, Food and Bezirk-managed Industries Department of the Central Committee
  - Mechanical Engineering and Metallurgy Department of the Central Committee
  - Planning and Finance Department of the Central Committee
  - Transport and Communications Department of the Central Committee
- Werner Lamberz
  - Agitation Department of the Central Committee
  - Propaganda Department of the Central Committee
  - "Karl Marx" Party Academy
- Ingeburg Lange (from 2 October 1973)
  - Women Department of the Central Committee (also department head)
- Günter Mittag (until 2 October 1973)
  - Construction Department of the Central Committee
  - Research and Technical Development Department of the Central Committee
  - Trade Unions and Social Policy Department of the Central Committee
  - Basic Industry Department of the Central Committee
  - Light, Food and Bezirk-managed Industries Department of the Central Committee
  - Mechanical Engineering and Metallurgy Department of the Central Committee
  - Planning and Finance Department of the Central Committee
  - Transport and Communications Department of the Central Committee
- Albert Norden
  - Friendly Parties Department of the Central Committee
  - Foreign Information Department of the Central Committee
  - West Department of the Central Committee of the Central Committee
- Paul Verner
  - Financial Administration and Party Businesses Department of the Central Committee
  - State and Legal Affairs Department of the Central Committee
  - Youth Department of the Central Committee
  - Sports Department of the Central Committee
  - Working Group on Church Issues of the Central Committee
  - Neuer Weg

== May 1976 ==
Elected at the 9th Party Congress of the SED:

- Hermann Axen
  - General Department of the Central Committee
  - International Relations Department of the Central Committee
  - Foreign Information Department of the Central Committee (from January 1979)
  - General Department of the Central Committee (from 1977)
- Horst Dohlus
  - Party Organs Department of the Central Committee (also department head)
- Gerhard Grüneberg (died 10 April 1981)
  - Agriculture Department of the Central Committee
- Kurt Hager
  - Health Policy Department of the Central Committee
  - Science Department of the Central Committee
  - Culture Department of the Central Committee
  - Public Education Department of the Central Committee
  - Institute for Marxism–Leninism at the Central Committee
  - Academy for Social Sciences at the Central Committee
  - Einheit
  - Dietz Publishing House
- Joachim Herrmann (from 25 May 1978)
  - Agitation Department of the Central Committee (from 1978)
  - Propaganda Department of the Central Committee (from 1978)
  - Friendly Parties Department of the Central Committee (from January 1979)
  - "Karl Marx" Party Academy (from 1978)
- Erich Honecker
  - General Secretary of the Central Committee
  - Cadre Affairs Department of the Central Committee
  - Security Affairs Department of the Central Committee
  - General Department of the Central Committee (until 1977)
- Werner Jarowinsky
  - Trade and Supply Department of the Central Committee
- Werner Krolikowski (until October 1976)
  - Construction Department of the Central Committee
  - Research and Technical Development Department of the Central Committee
  - Trade Unions and Social Policy Department of the Central Committee
  - Basic Industry Department of the Central Committee
  - Light, Food and Bezirk-managed Industries Department of the Central Committee
  - Mechanical Engineering and Metallurgy Department of the Central Committee
  - Planning and Finance Department of the Central Committee
  - Transport and Communications Department of the Central Committee
- Werner Lamberz (died on 6 March 1978)
  - Agitation Department of the Central Committee
  - Propaganda Department of the Central Committee
  - "Karl Marx" Party Academy
- Ingeburg Lange (from 1978)
  - Women Department of the Central Committee (also department head)
- Günter Mittag (from November 1976)
  - Construction Department of the Central Committee
  - Research and Technical Development Department of the Central Committee
  - Trade Unions and Social Policy Department of the Central Committee
  - Basic Industry Department of the Central Committee
  - Light, Food and Bezirk-managed Industries Department of the Central Committee
  - Mechanical Engineering and Metallurgy Department of the Central Committee
  - Planning and Finance Department of the Central Committee
  - Transport and Communications Department of the Central Committee
- Albert Norden (until January 1979)
  - Friendly Parties Department of the Central Committee
  - Foreign Information Department of the Central Committee
  - West Department of the Central Committee of the Central Committee
- Paul Verner
  - Financial Administration and Party Businesses Department of the Central Committee
  - West Department of the Central Committee of the Central Committee
  - State and Legal Affairs Department of the Central Committee
  - Youth Department of the Central Committee
  - Sports Department of the Central Committee
  - Working Group on Church Issues of the Central Committee
  - Neuer Weg

== April 1981 ==
Elected at the 10th Party Congress of the SED:

- Hermann Axen
  - International Politics and Economics Department of the Central Committee (from 22 November 1985)
  - General Department Working Group of the Central Committee (until 25 June 1984, integrated into the International Relations Department)
  - International Relations Department of the Central Committee
  - Foreign Information Department of the Central Committee
- Horst Dohlus
  - Party Organs Department of the Central Committee (also department head)
  - Neuer Weg (from 24 May 1984)
- Werner Felfe
  - Agriculture Department of the Central Committee
- Herbert Häber (from 24 May 1984 to 22 November 1985)
  - International Politics and Economics Department of the Central Committee (also department head)
- Kurt Hager
  - Health Policy Department of the Central Committee
  - Science Department of the Central Committee
  - Culture Department of the Central Committee
  - Public Education Department of the Central Committee
  - Institute for Marxism–Leninism at the Central Committee
  - Academy for Social Sciences at the Central Committee
  - Einheit
  - Dietz Publishing House
  - "Karl Marx" Party Academy (from 1983)
- Joachim Herrmann
  - Agitation Department of the Central Committee
  - Propaganda Department of the Central Committee
  - Friendly Parties Department of the Central Committee
  - "Karl Marx" Party Academy (until 1983)
- Erich Honecker
  - General Secretary of the Central Committee
  - Cadre Affairs Department of the Central Committee
  - Security Affairs Department of the Central Committee (until 26 October 1983)
- Werner Jarowinsky
  - Trade, Supply and Foreign Trade Department of the Central Committee (Trade and Supply until 24 May 1984)
  - Working Group on Church Issues of the Central Committee (from 24 May 1984)
- Egon Krenz (from 26 October 1983)
  - Security Affairs Department of the Central Committee
  - State and Legal Affairs Department of the Central Committee
  - Youth Department of the Central Committee
  - Sports Department of the Central Committee
- Ingeburg Lange
  - Women Department of the Central Committee (also department head)
- Günter Mittag
  - Construction Department of the Central Committee
  - Research and Technical Development Department of the Central Committee
  - Trade Unions and Social Policy Department of the Central Committee
  - Basic Industry Department of the Central Committee
  - Light, Food and Bezirk-managed Industries Department of the Central Committee
  - Mechanical Engineering and Metallurgy Department of the Central Committee
  - Planning and Finance Department of the Central Committee
  - Transport and Communications Department of the Central Committee
- Konrad Naumann
- Paul Verner (until 24 May 1984)
  - Financial Administration and Party Businesses Department of the Central Committee (until 24 May 1984, Integrated into the Politburo's Office)
  - West Department of the Central Committee (until 24 May 1984, renamed International Politics and Economics Department)
  - Working Group on Church Issues of the Central Committee (until 24 May 1984)
  - Neuer Weg (until 24 May 1984)
  - State and Legal Affairs Department of the Central Committee (until 26 October 1983)
  - Youth Department of the Central Committee (until 26 October 1983)
  - Sports Department of the Central Committee (until 26 October 1983)

== April 1986 ==
Elected at the 11th Party Congress of the SED:

- Erich Honecker (until 18 October 1989)
  - General Secretary of the Central Committee
  - Cadre Affairs Department of the Central Committee

Secretaries with areas of responsibility

- Hermann Axen
  - International Politics and Economics Department of the Central Committee
  - International Relations Department of the Central Committee
  - Foreign Information Department of the Central Committee
- Horst Dohlus
  - Party Organs Department of the Central Committee
  - Neuer Weg
- Werner Felfe (died 7 September 1988)
  - Agriculture Department of the Central Committee
- Kurt Hager
  - Health Policy Department of the Central Committee
  - Science Department of the Central Committee
  - Culture Department of the Central Committee
  - Public Education Department of the Central Committee
  - Institute for Marxism–Leninism at the Central Committee
  - Academy for Social Sciences at the Central Committee
  - Einheit
  - Dietz Publishing House
  - "Karl Marx" Party Academy
- Joachim Herrmann (until 18 October 1989)
  - Agitation Department of the Central Committee
  - Propaganda Department of the Central Committee
  - Friendly Parties Department of the Central Committee
- Werner Jarowinsky
  - Trade, Supply and Foreign Trade Department of the Central Committee
  - Church Affairs Department of the Central Committee
- Egon Krenz
  - General Secretary of the Central Committee (from 18 October 1989)
  - Security Affairs Department of the Central Committee
  - State and Legal Affairs Department of the Central Committee
  - Youth Department of the Central Committee
  - Sports Department of the Central Committee
- Werner Krolikowski (from December 1988)
  - Agriculture Department of the Central Committee
- Günter Mittag (until 18 October 1989)
  - Construction Department of the Central Committee
  - Research and Technical Development Department of the Central Committee
  - Trade Unions and Social Policy Department of the Central Committee
  - Basic Industry Department of the Central Committee
  - Light, Food and Bezirk-managed Industries Department of the Central Committee
  - Mechanical Engineering and Metallurgy Department of the Central Committee
  - Planning and Finance Department of the Central Committee
  - Transport and Communications Department of the Central Committee
- Ingeburg Lange
  - Women Department of the Central Committee (also department head)
- Günter Schabowski
  - Agitation Department of the Central Committee (from 30 October 1989)

== November 1989 ==
Elected at the 10th Plenum of the Central Committee on 8 November 1989:

- Johannes Chemnitzer (until 10 November 1989)
  - Agriculture Department of the Central Committee
- Wolfgang Herger
  - Security Affairs Department of the Central Committee
  - State and Legal Affairs Department of the Central Committee
- Egon Krenz
  - General Secretary of the Central Committee
  - Youth Department of the Central Committee
  - Sports Department of the Central Committee
- Ingeburg Lange (until 10 November 1989)
  - Women Department of the Central Committee
- Siegfried Lorenz
  - Party Organs Department of the Central Committee
- Wolfgang Rauchfuß
  - Construction Department of the Central Committee
  - Research and Technical Development Department of the Central Committee
  - Trade Unions and Social Policy Department of the Central Committee
  - Basic Industry Department of the Central Committee
  - Light, Food and Bezirk-managed Industries Department of the Central Committee
  - Mechanical Engineering and Metallurgy Department of the Central Committee
  - Planning and Finance Department of the Central Committee
  - Transport and Communications Department of the Central Committee
- Günter Schabowski
  - Agitation Department of the Central Committee
- Günter Sieber
  - International Politics and Economics Department of the Central Committee
- Helmut Semmelmann (from 10 November 1989)
  - Agriculture Department of the Central Committee
- Hans-Joachim Willerding
  - International Relations Department of the Central Committee
  - Foreign Information Department of the Central Committee

In addition, Klaus Höpcke (Head of the Cultural Commission at the Politburo) and Gregor Schirmer (Head of the Commission for Science and Education at the Politburo) attended all meetings of the Secretariat as permanent guests. They thus de facto took over the area of responsibility of Kurt Hager. A direct election to the Central Committee secretaries was not possible, as neither Höpcke nor Schirmer were Central Committee members and co-optation to the Central Committee outside of the party conferences was not provided for in the SED statutes.

== See also ==
- Departments of the Central Committee of the Socialist Unity Party of Germany
- List of members of the SED Party Executive Committee
- List of members of the Politburo of the Central Committee of the SED
- List of candidates for the Politburo of the Central Committee of the SED

== Sources ==
- Andreas Herbst, Gerd-Rüdiger Stephan, Jürgen Winkler (ed.): The SED. History, organization, politics. A handbook. Dietz, Berlin 1997, ISBN 3-320-01951-1.
