= Honeck =

Honeck is a surname. Notable people with the surname include:

- Anna Honeck Mangold (c. 1869–1947), American businesswoman
- Manfred Honeck (born 1958), Austrian conductor
- Stewart G. Honeck (1906–1999), American lawyer and politician
- Richard Honeck (1879–1976), American murderer

== See also ==
- Honecker (surname)
