= Ingeburg Lange =

German politician (1927–2013)

Inge Lange
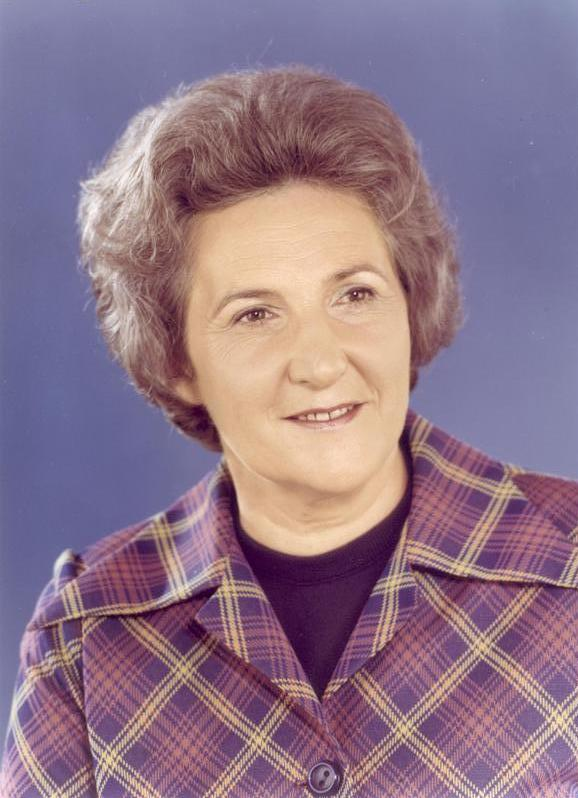
- Lange in 1976

Secretary for Woman of the Central Committee Secretariat
- In office 1978 – 8 November 1989
- General Secretary: Erich Honecker; Egon Krenz
- Preceded by: Erich Honecker
- Succeeded by: Position abolished

Head of the Department for Woman of the Central Committee
- In office August 1961 – 8 November 1989
- Secretary: Erich Honecker; Paul Verner; herself
- Deputy: Elli Glöckner
- Preceded by: Hilde Krasnogolowy
- Succeeded by: Position abolished
Parliamentary constituencies
Member of the Volkskammer for Halberstadt, Wernigerode
In office 14 November 1963 – 16 November 1989
Preceded by	multi-member district
Succeeded by	Wolfgang Beck
In office 30 July 1953 – 17 October 1954
Preceded by	multi-member district
Succeeded by	multi-member district

Personal details
- Born: Ingeburg Rosch; 24 July 1927 Leipzig, Free State of Saxony, Weimar Republic (now Germany)
- Died: 13 July 2013 (aged 85) Berlin, Germany
- Party: SED-PDS (1989–1990)
- Other political affiliations: Socialist Unity Party (1946–1989); Communist Party of Germany (1945–1946)
- Children: Katja Lange-Müller
- Education: Party Academy Karl Marx
- Occupation: Politician; Party Functionary; Teacher
- Awards: Patriotic Order of Merit, 1st class; Banner of Labor; Order of Karl Marx
- Central institution membership: 1973–1989: Candidate member, Politburo of the Central Committee; 1964–1989: Full member, Central Committee; 1963–1964: Candidate member, Central Committee; Other offices held: 1950–1951: Second Secretary, Free German Youth in Berlin; 1949–1950: First Secretary, Free German Youth Territorial Organization Wismut

Ingeburg "Inge" Lange (24 July 1927 – 13 July 2013) was an East German politician.

Along with Margarete Müller and Margot Honecker she was one of a small number of women to reach the higher ranks in the country's power structure. She was the leader of the Women Department of the Central Committee of the country's ruling Socialist Unity Party of Germany (SED / Sozialistische Einheitspartei Deutschlands). She played a central role in liberalising East German abortion laws.

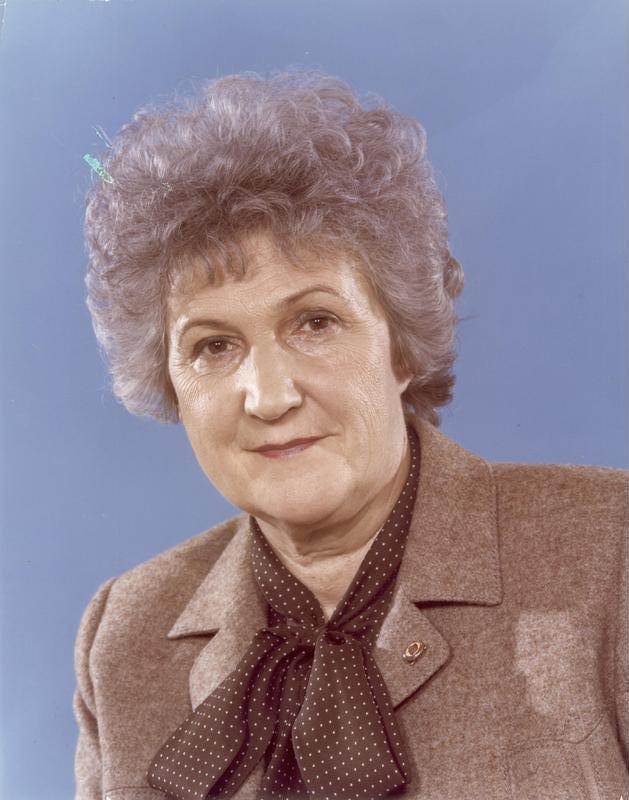
Lange in 1982

== Life ==
=== Early years ===
Inge Lange was born into a politically conscious family in Leipzig, as Ingeburg Rosch. Her father was Alfred Rosch (1899–1945), a Communist Party activist. While she was still a young child, the reality of post-democratic Germany came to her home when her father was arrested for transporting illegal (political) books and, for a period, imprisoned in 1935/36. Ingeburg secured a training as a dressmaker between 1943 and 1946. In 1945 she became a member of Antifascist youth in the Großzschocher quarter of Leipzig.

=== Politics ===
In 1945 she joined the Communist Party (KPD). Following the forced merger, in what was becoming the German Democratic Republic, of the KPD and the SPD (party), this left her, in 1946, as a member of the newly formed Socialist Unity Party of Germany (SED / Sozialistische Einheitspartei Deutschlands). Specifically, between 1946 and 1961 Lange had a succession of positions within the ruling SED party's youth wing, the Free German Youth ( FDJ / Freie Deutsche Jugend).

=== Teaching and youth work ===
She undertook a teacher training course in 1946/47 after which she became an assistant at the Antifascist School at Königs Wusterhausen. In 1947 she became a teacher at the North-west Youth School in Mutzschen. Between 1947 and 1949 she was Secretary, and then in 1950 First Secretary with the regional Free German Youth organisation at Wismut SAG, the tightly controlled (on behalf of the Soviets) and strategically critical uranium mining operation near the Czechoslovak border.

=== National politics ===
Between 1948 and 1950 Lange belonged to the Wusmut region leadership of the country's ruling SED party and was a member of its secretariat. In 1950/51 she served as Second Secretary of the FDJ executive for the greater Berlin region. From May 1952 till December 1961 she worked as the Secretary to the Central Council of the FDJ.

Between September 1951 and July 1952 she studied at the Komsomol Lenin Academy in Moscow, which can be seen as a mark of appreciation from Moscow for a difficult job well done during her time at Wismut. Between 1955 and 1961 she undertook a correspondence course at the prestigious Karl Marx Academy, which led her to a degree in Social sciences.

=== Abortion law ===
In August 1961 Ingeburg Lange succeeded Edith Baumann and Hilde Krasnogolowy as head of the Party Central Committee working group and department concerned with women. In the Women Commission set up by Walter Ulbricht controversy was generated by the theme of women's ability to take decisions for themselves regarding their bodies. This in effect was the so-called abortion debate that was also a political theme in western politics at the time, but underpinned in East Germany by a desperate labour shortage caused by the scale of male deaths in the war and compounded by the massive emigration of working age citizens from East to West Germany in the decade before the inner German border was fortified. The East German abortion law was eventually passed on 9 Match 1972. Unusually for East Germany, the parliamentary vote was not unanimous 14 members voted against the new law which for the first time gave women the right, during the first twelve weeks of a pregnancy, to choose to have an abortion. Another aspect of the legislation was free distribution of the contraceptive pill. There were those who opposed 1972 Abortion legislation both in the medical profession and in the churches. Although the legislation is generally seen as Inge Lange's achievement, it would not have come about without powerful support from other influential members of the East German political elite, notably Margot Honecker whose husband took over as the East German national leader a year or so before the law was passed.

Women's place

"Never before have we women lived in a state of which we can truly say that it owns our hearts, our knowledge and our deeds, but that is our state."

Inge Lange addressing the Politburo (1969)

„Noch nie zuvor haben wir Frauen in einem Staat gelebt, von dem wir wahrhaft sagen können, daß ihm unser Herz, unser Wissen und unsere Tat gehören; denn das ist unser Staat.“

Inge Lange addressing the Politburo (1969)

=== Further political promotions and appointments ===
She sat as a member of the National legislature (Volkskammer) from 1952 till 1954 and then from 1963 till 1989. Between 1963 and 1967 she was a member of the assembly's committee for Industry, Construction and Traffic, and from 1971 deputy chair of the Committee for Work and Social policy.

In 1963 Lange was nominated as a candidate for membership of The Party central Committee. Progression from Central Committee candidature to membership often took many years, but Inge Lange progressed to Central Committee membership rapidly, being appointed in early December 1964.

With the German Democratic Republic collapsing, on 8 November she resigned from the Central Committee of the party's politburo, but she was then selected as a candidate for the replacement politburo. The entire central committee then resigned on 3 December 1989. On 21 January 1990 she was one of those expelled from The Party, which was now in the process of mutating into the PDS (Party of Democratic Socialism). After this she withdrew from public life.

=== Death ===
Inge Lange died in a Berlin hospital on 13 July 2013.

== Awards ==
- 1959 Patriotic Order of Merit in Bronze
- 1964 Patriotic Order of Merit in Silver
- 1969 Banner of Labor
- 1977 Order of Karl Marx
- 1987 Order of Karl Marx

== Daughter ==
Inge Lange's daughter is the prize-winning novelist Katja Lange-Müller.

== Publications (not a complete list) ==
- Aktuelle Probleme der Arbeit mit den Frauen bei der weiteren Verwirklichung der Beschlüsse des VIII. Parteitages der SED. Dietz-Verlag, Berlin 1974 (Vorträge im Parteilehrjahr der SED 1973/74).
- Die Verwirklichung der Beschlüsse des IX. Parteitages der SED zur weiteren Förderung der Frau. Parteihochschule beim ZK der SED, Berlin 1979.
- with Erich Honecker: Aus der Rede des Genossen Erich Honecker. Aus dem Bericht des Politbüros an das Zentralkomitee der SED. Berichterstatter: Genossin Inge Lange. Aus den Diskussionsreden. Beschlüsse. 12. Tagung des ZK der SED 21./22. Mai 1980. Dietz-Verlag, Berlin 1980.
- Die Frauen – aktive Mitgestalterinnen des Sozialismus. Dietz-Verlag, Berlin 1987.
- In der Frauenpolitik, so Ulbricht, dürfen nicht die Buchhalter reden. In: Egon Krenz (edited/compiled.): Walter Ulbricht. Zeitzeugen erinnern sich. Das Neue Berlin, Berlin 2013, ISBN 978-3-360-02160-1.
