= Manfred Feist =

German politician (1930–2012)

Head of the Foreign Information Department
- In office 17 September 1966 – 24 November 1989
- Secretary: Albert Norden; Hermann Axen; Hans-Joachim Willerding
- Preceded by: Werner Lamberz
- Succeeded by: Reiner Kalisch

Personal details
- Born: Manfred Feist; 6 April 1930 Halle an der Saale, Province of Saxony, Free State of Prussia, Weimar Republic (now Saxony-Anhalt, Germany)
- Died: 17 December 2012 (aged 82) Berlin, Germany
- Party: Socialist Unity Party (1947–1989)
- Occupation: Politician; Party Functionary
- Awards: Banner of Labor; Patriotic Order of Merit, 1st class; Hero of Labour
- Central institution membership: 1976–1989: Full member, Central Committee; 1971–1976: Candidate member, Central Committee; Other offices held: 1954–1958: Department Head, Committee for German Unity

Manfred Feist (born Halle 6 April 1930 died Berlin 17 December 2012) was a German politician and party functionary. He served as Director of the Foreign Information Department of the Central Committee of the ruling SED (party).

His notability is enhanced by the marriage, in 1953, of his elder sister Margot to a political high-flyer called Erich Honecker. As a result of this, between 1971 and 1989 Manfred Feist found himself the brother in law of East Germany's de facto head of state. Over the years he was subjected to greater media scrutiny than would normally have been applied to political functionaries at his level of competence: his tongue-in-cheek soubriquet "Manny the Great" ("Manni der Große") allegedly used by colleagues, was publicized even in West Germany.

== Life ==
=== Early years ===
Manfred Feist was born in 1930, during the economically distressed closing years of Germany's Weimar chapter, in the south-inner city (Glaucha) quarter of Halle.

Feist's father, Gotthard, was a shoe maker: his mother Helene worked in a mattress factory. Manfred Freist successfully completed his secondary schooling and, in 1947, the year of his seventeenth birthday, joined the new country's ruling Socialist Unity Party of Germany (SED / Sozialistische Einheitspartei Deutschlands), along with its youth wing, the Free German Youth (FDJ / Freie Deutsche Jugend). He attended the Regional Party School in Halle and became a District Leader and instructor with the FDJ.

=== Middle years ===
He studied law, obtaining a doctorate in 1963.

Between 1966 and 1989 Manfred Feist served, in succession to Werner Lamberz, as Director of the Foreign Information Department of the Central Committee of the ruling SED (party). He was also a member of the World Peace Council and of the Main Committee of the East German Peace council. Both appointments were achieved with help from Erich Honecker. In 1971 he was nominated as a candidate for membership of the Party Central Committee, and in 1976 he was elected to membership of it.

Feist was also involved in the organisation of the Olof Palme Peace March.

=== Later years ===
In 1995 Manfred Feist suffered a stroke, after which he was paralysed down one side of his body. Following a long period of ill-health he died in Berlin on 17 December 2012. His death was made public only after a delay of more than two weeks, when an announcement was placed in the Berliner Zeitung. Press speculation focused on the question of whether Margot Honecker would return to Germany from her Chilean exile for her younger brother's funeral.

Feist was buried in Cemetery Pankow III in the Berlin-Niederschönhausen district.

== Awards ==
- 1970 Patriotic Order of Merit in Silver
- 1974 Banner of Labor
- 1980 Patriotic Order of Merit in Gold
- 1981 Banner of Labor Top grade (Stufe I)
- 1988 Hero of Labour
