= Paul Wessel =

Paul Wessel (born 9 April 1904 in Plauen; d. 20 January 1967 in Berlin) was a member of the small secretariat of the Politburo of the Central Committee of the Socialist Unity Party of Germany, the communist party of the former German Democratic Republic.

== Life ==
Wessel graduated from a vocational school training as a metal worker. In 1918 he joined the Socialist Workers' Youth and was a member of the Social Democratic Party of Germany from 1921 to 1932 and a correspondent for the SPD parliamentary faction of Saxony from 1926 to 1927. He later joined the Socialist Workers' Party of Germany. From 1929 to 1932 he was a worker and foreman at Chemische Werke Wolfen, then foreman of an artificial silk plant in Athens, and during the years 1939 to 1945 he was a foreman in the Agfa film factory in Wolfen.

In 1945 he was chairman of the SPD of Wolfen. From the beginning of 1946, he was head of the Economic Section of the SPD for the province of Saxony in Halle, Saxony-Anhalt, then head of the Economic Department of the SED State Association of Saxony-Anhalt and Member of Parliament. Finally, until 1949, he was secretary of the SED state association in Halle. During 1949–1951, he, Fred Oelßner, and Edith Baumann were members of the small secretariat of the Politburo.

After attending the Party School from 1950 to 1960 he was deputy director and general manager of a foreign trade company, a member of the Trade Council in Pyongyang until 1965, and later worked in the Ministry of Foreign Affairs and German domestic trade.
