= Honika =

Honika may refer to:

- Hanukkah, Jewish religious holiday
- Honikas, Greek team within Argolida Football Clubs Association

== See also ==
- Honecker (surname)
