= Beate Ulbricht =

Adopted daughter of Walter and Lotte Ulbricht (1944–1991)

- Born: Марія Пестунова, Maria Pestunova; 6 May 1944; Leipzig, Nazi Germany
- Died: 27 November – 3 December 1991 (aged 47); Berlin, Germany
- Education: Leningrad State Pedagogical Institute

Beate Ulbricht (born Ukrainian: Марія Пестунова, romanized: Maria Pestunova; 6 May 1944 – between 27 November and 3 December 1991), also known as Beate Matteoli, was the adopted daughter of the first secretary of the East German SED, Walter Ulbricht and his wife Lotte.

== Biography ==
=== Parentage and adoption ===
Ulbricht was born Maria Pestunova in 1944 in Leipzig during the Nazi dictatorship in Germany. Her birth mother was a Ukrainian forced labourer from the Soviet Union; the identity of her father was unknown. In summer 1944, shortly after Ulbricht's birth, her mother died in an air raid bombing. Maria was sent to an orphanage, whereupon she was adopted for a short time before her foster mother decided to return her. In January 1946, she was adopted a second time by Walter Ulbricht, then a member of the Landtag of Saxony, and his partner Lotte. It was the second attempt at adoption for the couple, who wanted children, but were unable to have them on their own because prior illnesses left Lotte Ulbricht unable to conceive. Beate Ulbricht's birth parentage was kept secret from the public until after the fall of the Berlin Wall. Because of Soviet laws which prevented children born to Soviet citizens from being adopted by foreign parents, Ulbricht's adoption was not formally approved until 26 August 1950, with the caveat that she could not renounce Soviet citizenship in favor of East German citizenship.

=== Education ===
At age 2, Ulbricht suffered from health problems, but she managed to overcome them and continue her primary school education in Berlin. In 1954, she enrolled at the Russian school on Kissingenstraße in Pankow, where her status made her a target of bullying from her fellow students. When she was 15 years old, her adoptive parents, now legally married, sent her to Leningrad for high school. There she studied history and Russian at the Leningrad State Pedagogical Institute. In 1962, she began a romantic relationship with Ivanko Matteoli, the son of an Italian Communist Party functionary. The two married over her parents' objections in Pankow in October 1963, after which Ulbricht dropped out of her studies.

=== Relationships and marriage ===
After the birth of Ulbricht's daughter in February 1965, she expressed her desire to return to Leningrad in order to avoid continued rejection and hostility from her parents. After her husband left for the Soviet Union to prepare the move, their plans were thwarted when the East German government confiscated her passport. In 1967, Ulbricht consented to her parents' wishes and divorced her husband, whereupon her passport was returned the following day. She flew to Leningrad to find her ex-husband, but was unsuccessful in locating him. While in the Soviet Union, she met a former classmate, Yuri Polkovnikov, whom she married in March 1968. In January 1969 she gave birth to a son and resumed her studies. Ulbricht was subjected to violence from her husband and became an alcoholic as a result. After the death of Ulbricht's father in 1973, she divorced Polkovnikov and returned to East Germany. There she lived with her two children in social circumstances made difficult by her estrangement from her parents. At the end of the 1970s, the authorities removed her children from her custody.

=== Later life and death ===
Between 27 August and 7 September 1991, Ulbricht gave an 11-part interview to the tabloid Super!, wherein she discussed personal details about life with her family.

On the night of 3/4 December 1991, neighbors of her apartment in the Lichtenberg borough of eastern Berlin reported loud arguments, barking dogs and many men coming and going to police. When they arrived, they found Ulbricht's body, with facial injuries and showing signs of prolonged alcohol abuse. She had either fallen or been beaten; the manner of death, whether an accident or homicide, has never been determined. If she was murdered, her death has been linked to that of a man, said to have once been her lover, found stabbed in his burnt apartment almost two years later. Lotte Ulbricht was apparently unsurprised, saying "Fancy that ...", when a reporter visited her to inform her of her daughter's death.

== Relationship with adoptive parents ==
Upon Ulbricht's adoption, she was expected to play her part as a member of the model East German socialist family. Lotte Ulbricht wrote to adoption authorities that she aspired to raise her daughter into a "valuable member of the new Germany." According to her housekeeper, "[she] wanted above all for [Beate Ulbricht] to be the best." Public and private pressures became increasingly burdensome to her as she got older. When in her teenage years she began to rebel against her parents, she was punished by being sent to study in the Soviet Union.

After Ulbricht wed her first husband, she was subjected to a campaign of harassment by East German authorities. Her parents revoked her privileges, cut off further contact, and forced her to work as a solderer at the VEB Stern-Radio plant in Berlin. She learned after her father's death that she had been disinherited from his will.

Ulbricht spoke warmly about her adoptive father, Walter, who had treated her well and doted upon her. But she referred to her mother, Lotte, as "the hag," calling her "cold-hearted and egotistic." According to her, Walter Ulbricht married Lotte on the orders of Stalin.

== See also ==
- List of unsolved deaths
