= Horst Dohlus =

German politician

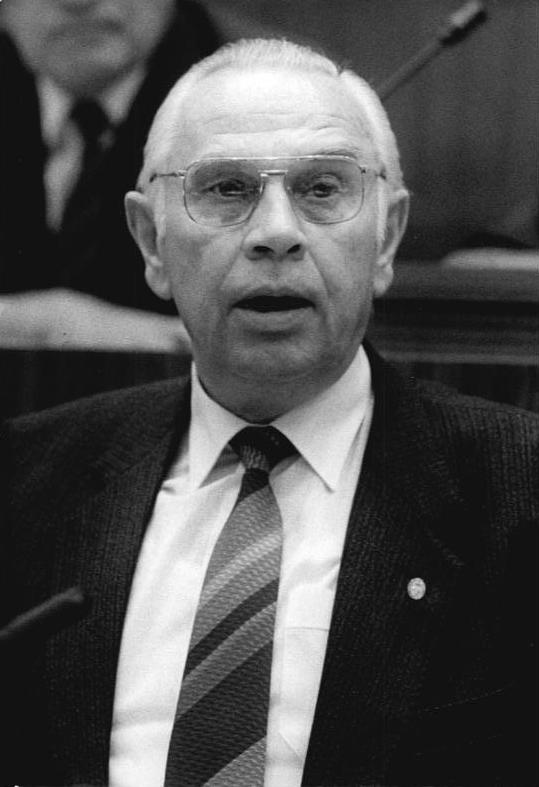
- Dohlus in 1986

Secretary for Party Organs of the Central Committee Secretariat
- In office 19 June 1971 – 8 November 1989
- General Secretary: Erich Honecker
- Preceded by: Erich Honecker
- Succeeded by: Position abolished

Head of the Party Organs Department
- In office 23 July 1960 – 21 April 1986
- Secretary: Erich Honecker; himself
- Deputy: Johann Raskop; Werner Eberlein; Heinz Mirtschin
- Preceded by: Werner Guse
- Succeeded by: Heinz Mirtschin
Parliamentary constituencies
Member of the Volkskammer for Annaberg, Marienberg, Schwarzenberg
In office 14 November 1971 – 16 November 1989
| Preceded by | multi-member district |
| Succeeded by | Horst Klose |
In office 15 October 1950 – 17 October 1954
| Preceded by | multi-member district |
| Succeeded by | multi-member district |

Personal details
- Born: Horst Paul Dohlus; 30 May 1925 Plauen, Free State of Saxony, Weimar Republic (now Germany)
- Died: 28 April 2007 (aged 81) Berlin, Germany
- Party: SED-PDS (1989–1990)
- Other political affiliations: Socialist Unity Party (1946–1989); Communist Party of Germany (1928–1946)
- Occupation: Politician; Party Functionary; Barber
- Awards: Patriotic Order of Merit, 1st class; Banner of Labor; Hero of Labour; Order of Karl Marx
- Central institution membership: 1980–1989: Full member, Politburo of the Central Committee; 1976–1980: Candidate member, Politburo of the Central Committee; 1963–1989: Full member, Central Committee; 1950–1963: Candidate member, Central Committee; Other offices held: 1986–1989: Member, Cadre Commission of the Central Committee Secretariat; 1958–1960: Second Secretary, Socialist Unity Party in Bezirk Cottbus; 1951–1953: Second Secretary, Socialist Unity Party at SDAG Wismut; 1951–1951: Acting First Secretary, Socialist Unity Party at SDAG Wismut

Horst Dohlus (30 May 1925 – 28 April 2007) was a high ranking SED party functionary in the German Democratic Republic and a member of the country's National Legislative Assembly (Volkskammer).

In 1995, following reunification, Dohlus was one of those who stood trial on serious criminal charges resulting from some of the policies which East Germany's ruling party had enforced. As a result of that trial, in 1997, the country's last head of state, Egon Krenz, found himself given a six-year prison sentence by the court. However, due their personal health issues, the trial of four of the accused, including Dohlus, was not able to proceed to a conclusion.

== Life ==
=== Early years ===
Dohlus was born into a working-class family in what was then a large town near the southern frontier of central Germany. He attended lower and middle schools locally before moving on in 1939 to a three-year apprenticeship as a Hairdresser. He continued to work in hairdressing till 1943. In 1943, now aged 18, he was conscripted for Labour service, but because of the pressures of World War II, this very quickly became service in the army. He spent a year, between March 1945 and March 1946, as an American prisoner of war.

=== The Soviet Occupation Zone ===
On his release he joined the Communist Party. However, in April 1946 the Communist Party was replaced as part of a strategy for returning the entire region (which in 1949 would be re-founded as a new standalone state called the German Democratic Republic) to one-party rule. The Communist Party within the zone was merged, in theory on a basis of parity, with the more moderate left wing SPD (party) to form the Socialist Unity Party of Germany (SED / Sozialistische Einheitspartei Deutschlands). Dohlus now signed his membership across to the SED. Between 1946 and 1949 he worked as a miner near Annaberg. He was now employed the Saxony's strategically important uranium mines. In 1950 he took a job as a party official with the SDAG, (known after 1954 as "SDAG Wismut"), the locally based uranium mining conglomerate which was tightly controlled by the Soviets, who had by now requisitioned a large part of his hometown as a strategically located military garrison.

=== The German Democratic Republic ===
Horst Dohlus now made his transfer to national politics, between 1950 and 1954 sitting as a member of the young country's National Legislative Assembly (Volkskammer), and at the same time gaining promotion with regard to his party responsibilities in the Saxon mining business. Between 1951 and 1952 he served as First Secretary of the Wismut section Party leadership in Karl-Marx-Stadt (as Chemnitz was then known). The 1950s was a nervous time for the leaders of East Germany: directly after the rather more brutal downfall of Paul Merker, at the 23rd Central Committee Plenum in April 1955 Horst Dohlus received a reprimand from The Party for "behaviour damaging to the party and repeated violations of Party Morals" ("parteischädigenden Verhaltens u. fortgesetzter Verstöße gegen die Parteimoral").

"I was born on 30 May 1925 in Plauen, in the Vogtland, and I come from a working family .... antiFascist principals ... have defined my life ... Labour service... The army... Prisoner of War ... I came to value the friendship of the people from the Soviet Union ... to do everything to preserve peace.”
"Ich wurde am 30. Mai 1925 in Plauen im Vogtland geboren und stamme aus einer Arbeiterfamilie . . . antifaschistische Grundhaltung . . . prägte mein Leben . . . Arbeitsdienst . . . Wehrmacht . . . Kriegsgefangenschaft . . . die Freundschaft zu den Menschen der Sowjetunion schätzengelernt . . . alles zu tun für die Sicherung des Friedens."

Horst Dohlus addressing the court in 1996

Between September 1954 and August 1955 most of his time was spent in Moscow attending a course ("Lehrgang C" / "Course C") at the Communist Party Academy there. Whatever his violations of party morals may have involved, they did not terminate his party career, and on returning in 1955 he became the SED Central Committee's party organiser at the vast and prestigious new "Schwarze Pumpe" lignite based energy, heat and power combine. He stayed with Schwarze Pumpe till 1958 when he relocated to Cottbus: here, till 1960 he held a position as Second Secretary of the party's regional leadership team.

=== Career success ===
From 1960 right through till 1986 Dohlus headed up the Department for Party Organs of the Party Central Committee. In 1971, after an absence of 17 years, again became a member of the National Legislative Assembly (Volkskammer). In 1976 he was placed on the candidate list for membership of the Central Committee Politburo, membership of which followed in 1980. In 1986 he became a member of the Central Committee's powerful "Cadre Commission".

"I completely reject the allegation that my vote could have been willfully associated with causing these fatal outcomes [of people being shot while trying to escape from East Germany over the Berlin Wall]”
"Ich weise entschieden zurück, mit meiner Wahl wäre ein aktiver Täterwille zu diesen tödlichen Konsequenzen verbunden gewesen."

Horst Dohlus (who had been a member of the East German politburo since 1980) addressing the court in 1996
He went on to explain that while he regretted the deaths, there had never been an "inner border" between West Germany and East Germany. There had simply been a front-line separating two competing military groupings, the NATO and the Warsaw Pact, from one another. The way in which the front-line was controlled from the eastern side had been determined from Moscow and was not something that the East German politburo could have changed.

=== Changes ===
At the end of 1989 Horst Dohlus's political career fell victim to the rolling demise of the German Democratic Republic. On 9 November 1989 the Berlin Wall was breached. The German Democratic Republic was still hosting approximately 300,000 Soviet troops at this time, but after it became clear that the fraternal troops had no instructions to repress the demonstrations violently, the gate to reunification was seen to have been left open. Less than a month after the wall was breached the East German Politburo had resigned. On 20 January 1990, as part of a wider purge of East Germany's ruling SED (party) during the run up to reunification later that year, Horst Dohlus was thrown out of the party which was already in the process of re-inventing itself as the Party of Democratic Socialism ("SED/PDS").

== Awards and honours ==
- 1964 Patriotic Order of Merit
- 1968 Banner of Labor
- 1969 Patriotic Order of Merit
- 1970 Banner of Labor
- 1975 Hero of Labour
- 1979 Order of Karl Marx
- 1983 Patriotic Order of Merit
- 1985 Order of Karl Marx
