= Alfred Lemmnitz =

East German National Education Minister (1905–1994)

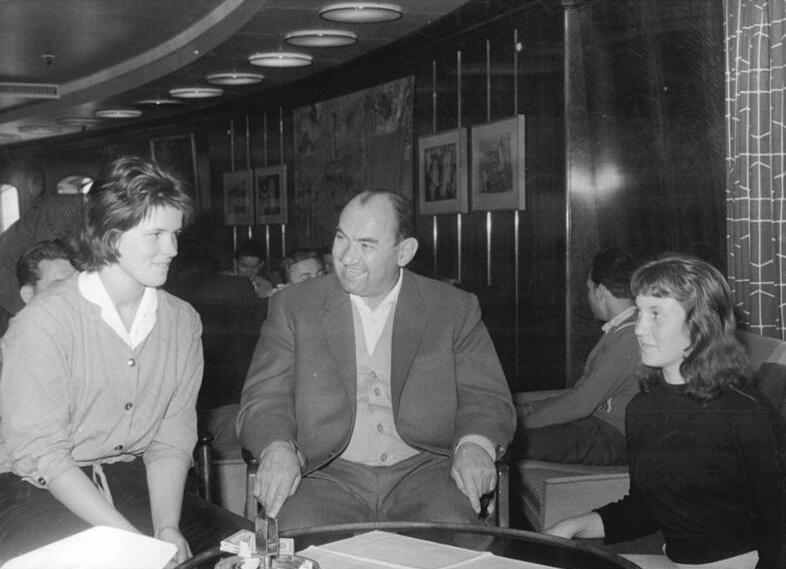
Federal Archives Image 183-74690-0008, MS "Völkerfreundschaft", Baltic Sea tour, Jungarbeiter.jpg

Alfred Lemmnitz (27 June 1905 – 23 September 1994) was an East German politician. He served as Minister for National Education from 1958 to 1963.

Lemmnitz was born in Taucha, Saxony and completed training as a typesetter and studies in economics at the University of Leipzig. From 1927 to 1931, he was a member of the Social Democratic Party of Germany (SPD) and youth leader of the Socialist Worker Youth in Moers. In 1931, he switched to the Communist Party of Germany (KPD) and joined the Communist Youth League of Germany (Kommunistischer Jugendverband Deutschlands; KJVD), becoming leader of the KJVD subdistrict of Duisburg-Hamborn.

In 1933, after the Nazis had seized power, he was working illegally for the KPD and ended up in "protective custody" many times. From October 1933 until 1936, he was at Börgermoor and Esterwegen concentration camps, and until 1937 in pre-trial custody in Duisburg. He was sentenced by the Volksgerichtshof to one year and nine months in prison, released from custody, and banished from the Ruhr area.

In April, Lemmnitz emigrated to the Netherlands, where he became a member of the KPD leadership in Amsterdam. After the Wehrmacht marched into the Netherlands, he was once again arrested and then sentenced by the Volksgerichtshof to ten years in labour prison (Zuchthaus). Until 1945, he was an inmate at the labour prison in Brandenburg-Görden.

In 1946, Lemmnitz joined the Socialist Unity Party of Germany (SED), took his studies up once again, graduating from the University of Leipzig in 1948. From 1948 to 1953, he held the chair for political economy at the Party College, and then until 1955, he was Professor of Political Economy and Dean of the Faculty of Economics at the University of Rostock. Until 1956, he was Rector of the College for Financial Science in Potsdam-Babelsberg, and until 1958, he held the same position at the Berlin College for Economics.

In December 1958, he succeeded Fritz Lange as Minister for National Education, thereby also becoming a member of the Council of Ministers of the GDR and the Ideological Commission at the SED Central Committee's Politburo. In November 1963, he was succeeded by Margot Honecker, who would hold the post until 1989. From 1963 to 1965, he was a scientific associate at the Economic Institute of the Academy of Sciences, until 1971, Acting Director of the German Economic Institute, and finally Associate of the Institute for International Politics and Science.

Lemmnitz received in 1958 the Medal for Fighters against Fascism, in 1959 the National Prize of East Germany, in 1959 and 1970, the Fatherland Order of Merit, in 1975 the Clasp of Honour on the Patriotic Order of Merit, in 1980 the Order of Karl Marx, and in 1985 the Star of People's Friendship.
