= Einheit =

Theoretical organ of the Socialist Unity Party of Germany

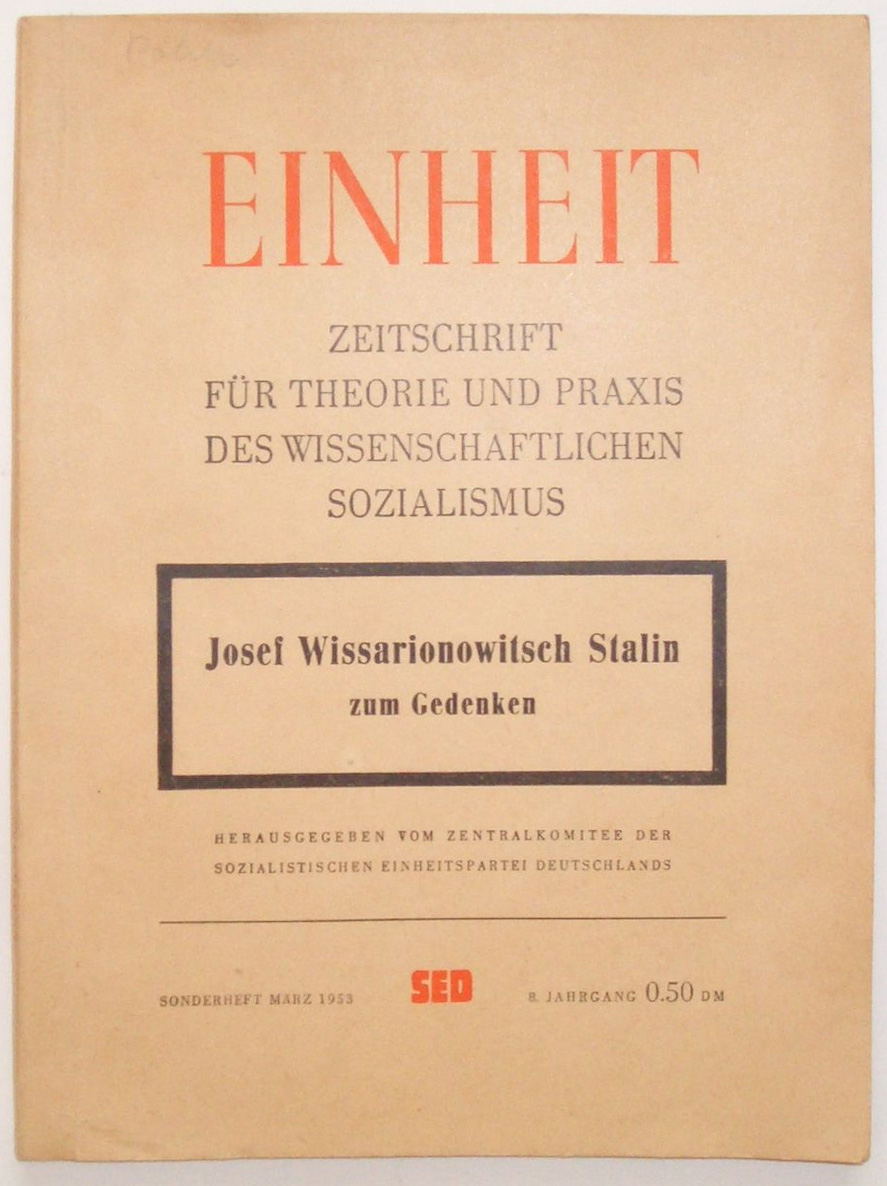

Einheit – Zeitschrift für Theorie und Praxis des Wissenschaftlichen Sozialismus (English: Unity – Journal for Theory and Practice of Scientific Socialism) was the theoretical journal of the Socialist Unity Party of Germany.

== History ==
The first issue of the journal was published in February 1946 preparation of the merger of the Communist Party of Germany and the Social Democratic Party of Germany. Prior to the merger the journal was published jointly by central committees of the KPD and SPD. The editorial board members of Einheit and also, of Neuer Weg, another official journal, were closely oversaw by the wife of Walter Ulbricht, Lotte Kühn.

The journal contained articles with theoretical content, in particular on the history of the labor movement and on philosophical and economic questions. The authors of the contributions were leading SED functionaries, senior employees of central party institutes such as the Institute of Marxism-Leninism, the Academy for Social Sciences, the party school and other theory-oriented cadres.

The magazine discontinued after German reunification in 1989.

== Editors and publishers ==
The editorial department of the Einheit was also a department of the Central Committee of the SED, so its editors-in-chief were also central committee department heads. Editors-in-chief were:

- 1946: Emmi Dölling (for the KPD)
- 1946: Max Seydewitz (for the SPD)
- 1946–1950: Klaus Zweiling
- 1950–1951: Gertrud Keller
- 1956–1972: Hans Schaul
- 1972–1989: Manfred Banaschak

The responsible secretaries in the Central Committee of the SED for the Einheit were:

- 1949: Otto Grotewohl
- 1950–1953: Fred Oelßner
- 1956–1958: Walter Ulbricht
- 1967–1989: Kurt Hager
