= Lotte Ulbricht =

German politician and wife of Walter Ulbricht (1903–2002)

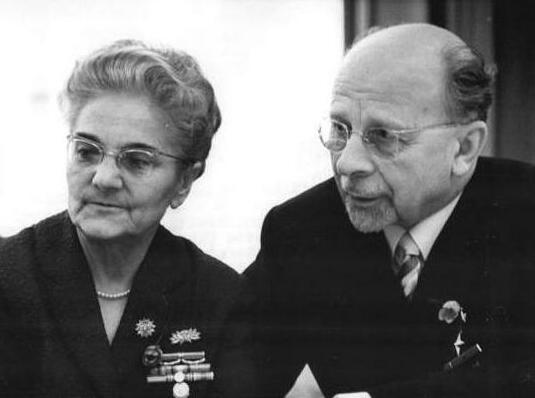
Lotte and Walter Ulbricht, 1967

Charlotte "Lotte" Ulbricht (née Kühn; 19 April 1903 – 27 March 2002) was a Socialist Unity Party of Germany (SED) official and the second wife of the East German leader Walter Ulbricht.

== Biography ==
She was born the younger of two children in Rixdorf in 1903. Her father was an unskilled labourer and her mother a homeworker in Berlin. After attending primary and middle school, she worked as an office worker and a shorthand typist. In 1919, she joined the Free Socialist Youth movement, and in 1921, the Communist Party of Germany. She worked for the Party's central committee and in 1922–23, was a shorthand typist with the Communist Youth International (KJI) in Moscow. Kühn was thereafter a member of the central committee of the KPD and the KPD Reichstag group. In 1926–27 she was archivist with the KJI and then until 1931, secretary and shorthand typist at the Soviet Union's bureau of commerce in Berlin. In 1931, she emigrated to Moscow with her first husband, Erich Wendt. She became an instructor with the Comintern and completed a distance learning study at the Academy of Marxism-Leninism and an evening course at Moscow State University. Following the arrest of her husband in 1936 during the Stalinist purges, she divorced him the same year and was herself investigated. She remained under an official Party reprimand until 1938. From 1939 to 1941, she worked as a compositor at a foreign language printer, and later for the Comintern until 1945.

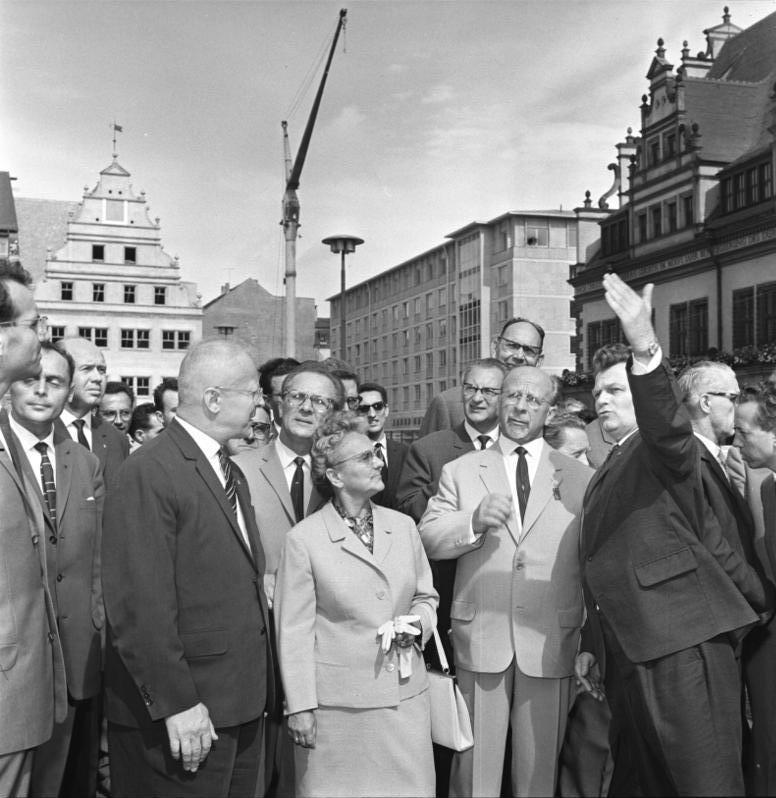
Walter and Lotte Ulbricht at the Leipzig Trade Fair, 1964

Kühn's older brother, Bruno, was discovered by the Gestapo in Amsterdam in 1943, working as a radio operator for the NKVD. He was executed in 1944, probably in Brussels.

Until 1947, she was a member of the central committee of the Communist Party. After 1947, she was a personal assistant to Walter Ulbricht, whom she knew from their time in Moscow, where they lived at the Hotel Lux, along with numerous other German exiles. After her 1953 marriage to Ulbricht, she resigned her job working for him and began studying at the Institute for Social Sciences, which awarded her a Social Sciences Diploma in 1959. During 1959–73, she was employed by the Institute for Marxism-Leninism, where, among other things, she was responsible for editing Walter Ulbricht's speeches and writings published by the Institute. She closely oversaw the editorial board members of the SED publications, namely Einheit and Neuer Weg.

In addition, she was a member of the Women's Commission of the Secretariat of the Central Committee and of the Politburo of the Central Committee of the Socialist Unity Party of Germany. She retired in July 1973, a few weeks before the death of her husband. Lotte Ulbricht was much feted by the state and party leadership of East Germany, including in 1959, 1963, and 1978 the Fatherland Order of Merit, in 1969 and 1983 the Order of Karl Marx, and in 1988 the Grand Star of Friendship of Nations.

In a rare interview, after German reunification, in 1990, she complained that "Honecker wasted my husband's inheritance". (Note: "Honecker hat das Erbe meines Mannes verspielt")

Ulbricht died on 27 March 2002. She lived at 12 Majakowskiring Street, Pankow, Berlin. She and Walter adopted a Russian girl, Beate Ulbricht (1944–1991).
