= Order of Karl Marx =

Most important and highly endowed Order of Merit of the German Democratic Republic (GDR)

Order of Karl Marx (Karl-Marx-Orden)
- Type: Order
- Presented by: East Germany
- Status: No longer awarded
- Established: May 5, 1953
- First award: 1953
- Final award: 1989
- Ribbon bar of the Order of Karl Marx

The Order of Karl Marx (German: Karl-Marx-Orden) was the most important order in the German Democratic Republic (GDR). The award of the order also included a prize of 20,000 East German marks.

The order was founded on May 5, 1953 on the occasion of Karl Marx's 135th birthday during Karl Marx Year and on the recommendation of the GDR Council of Ministers. It was granted to individuals, enterprises, organizations, and military groups for exceptional merit in relation to ideology, culture, economy, and other designations. Additionally, citizens of other countries could also be awarded the order.

== Notable recipients of the Order ==
- 1953: Otto Buchwitz, Hermann Duncker, Otto Franke, Otto Grotewohl, Luise Kähler, Olga Körner, Helmut Lehmann, Hermann Matern, Wilhelm Pieck, Hermann Schlimme, Rosa Thälmann, Walter Ulbricht, Wilhelm Zaisser
- 1956: Wilhelm Koenen
- 1961: Alfred Kurella, Gherman Titov
- 1962: Alexander Abusch, Karl Bittel, Franz Dahlem, Herbert Warnke, Otto Winzer
- 1963: Yuri Gagarin, Karl Maron, Willy Rumpf, Valentina Tereshkova
- 1964: Nikita Khrushchev
- 1965: Pavel Belyayev, Paul Fröhlich, Alexei Leonov, Hans Schaul
- 1966: Helene Berg
- 1967: Rudolf Dölling, John Heartfield, Wilhelm Kling, Karl Mewis
- 1968: Max Burghardt, Roman Chwalek, Kurt Seibt
- 1969: Walter Beling, Paul Dessau, Erich Honecker, Jürgen Kuczynski, Hermann Matern, Albert Norden, Willi Stoph, Lotte Ulbricht, Paul Verner
- 1970: Bruno Apitz, Otto Braun, Max Burghardt, Ernst Busch, Fritz Dallmann, Heinz Hoffmann, Erwin Kramer, Erich Mückenberger, Harry Tisch
- 1971: Erich Correns
- 1972: Fritz Cremer, Max Fechner, Klaus Gysi, Kurt Hager, Erich Honecker, Max Spangenberg
- 1973: Ernst Albert Altenkirch, Eva Altmann, Werner Bruschke, Friedrich Dickel, Ernst Goldenbaum, Erich Mielke, Fred Oelßner
- 1974: Walter Arnold, Kurt Bachmann, Walter Bartel, Bruno Beater, Jurij Brězan, Leonid Brezhnev, Walter Buchheim, Fritz Cremer, Käthe Dahlem, Arthur Franke, Alexander Schalck-Golodkowski, Willi Stoph, Josip Broz Tito, Markus Wolf, Todor Zhivkov
- 1975: Edmund Collein, Werner Eggerath, Horst Sindermann, Aleksandr Vasilevsky, Paul Wandel
- 1976: Vladimir Aksyonov, Hermann Axen, Valery Bykovsky, Luis Corvalán, Luise Ermisch, Manfred Ewald, Wolfgang Junker, Günter Mittag, Ernst Scholz, Paul Verner, Werner Walde
- 1977: Friedel Apelt, Hilde Benjamin, Klaus Gysi, Kurt Hager, Erich Honecker, Margot Honecker, Erich Mielke, Josip Broz Tito
- 1978: Valery Bykovsky, Fritz Eikemeier, Werner Felfe, Hans Modrow, Joachim Herrmann, Werner Krolikowski, Konrad Naumann, Elli Schmidt, Sigmund Jähn
- 1979: Leonid Brezhnev, Johannes Chemnitzer, Horst Dohlus, Peter Edel, Ernst Engelberg, Klaus Fuchs, Gerhard Grüneberg, Heinz Keßler, Charilaos Florakis
- 1980: Heinz Hoffmann, Alfred Lemmnitz, Siegfried Lorenz
- 1981: Leonid Brezhnev, Peter Florin, Erwin Geschonneck, Albert Norden, Gerhard Schürer
- 1982: Hilde Eisler, Kurt Hager, Erich Honecker, Kim Il Sung, Erich Mielke, Alexander Schalck-Golodkowski, Paul Scholz
- 1983: Theo Balden, Gerhard Beil, Friedrich Dickel, Wilhelm Ehm, Oskar Fischer, Egon Krenz, Werner Scheler, Lotte Ulbricht, Gustáv Husák
- 1984: 6th Flotilla of the East German People's Navy, Alfred Neumann, Willi Stoph, Wilhelm Sann
- 1985: Friedrich Dickel, Horst Dohlus, Heinz Hoffmann, Erich Honecker, Bruno Lietz, Erich Mückenberger, Ilse Thiele
- 1986: Heinz Adameck, Fidel Castro, Luise Dornemann, Gisela Glende, Günter Mittag
- 1987: Hilde Benjamin, Margot Honecker, Werner Jarowinsky, Erich Mielke, Markus Wolf
- 1988: Georgi Atanasov, Nicolae Ceaușescu, Manfred Gerlach, Joachim Herrmann, Kurt Seibt
- 1989: Horst Brünner, Angel Dimitrov, Aleksi Ivanov, Günter Schabowski, Willi Stoph, Petar Tanchev, Herbert Weiz, Günther Wyschofsky

== See also ==
- Orders, decorations, and medals of East Germany
- Order of Lenin
- Order of Georgi Dimitrov
- Order of Kim Il Sung
