= Anna Honeck Mangold =

American businesswoman (c.1869–1947)

Anna Honeck Mangold (c. 1869 – September 1, 1947) was an American businesswoman.

Born c. 1869, in Hermann, Missouri, to Henry Honeck, she moved to Dallas in 1888. In 1889, she married Charles A. Mangold (died 1934), a liquor seller who moved from Cincinnati, having four children together. On July 4, 1906, they established Lake Cliff Park; they established Lake Cliff Casino the same year. In 1918, they built the Jefferson Hotel. After her husband's death, she kept ownership of multiple banks, hotels, and some ranches and oil fields. She died in Dallas on September 1, 1947.
