= Neuer Weg (magazine) =

East German political magazine (1946–1989)

- Categories: Political magazine
- Frequency: Monthly; Weekly; Biweekly
- Publisher: Dietz Verlag
- Founded: 1946
- Final issue: 1989
- Country: German Democratic Republic
- Based in: East Berlin
- Language: German

Neuer Weg (German: New Path) was the official media outlet of the East German ruling party, Socialist Unity Party (SED). Its subtitle was organ des Zentralkomitees der SED fur Fragen des Parteilebens (German: Organ of the Central Committee of the SED for questions of party life). The magazine was in circulation between 1946 and 1989.

== History and profile ==
Neuer Weg was started in 1946. Its publisher was Dietz Verlag based in East Berlin. The magazine was first published monthly. Then its frequency was switched to weekly, but from 1953 it came out biweekly. It featured theoretical articles written by the leading members of the SED, including Werner Lamberz. The editorial board members of the magazine and also, of Einheit, another official journal, were closely oversaw by the wife of Walter Ulbricht, Lotte Kühn, during the former's term as first secretary of the SED. Neuer Weg folded in 1989.
