= Honecker (surname) =

Honecker is a German surname. Notable people with the surname include:

- Martin Honecker (1888–1941), German philosopher & psychologist
- Erich Honecker (1912–1994), German Communist politician
- Margot Honecker (1927–2016), German Communist politician & political-family member
