= Kurt Hager =

German communist politician (1912–1998)

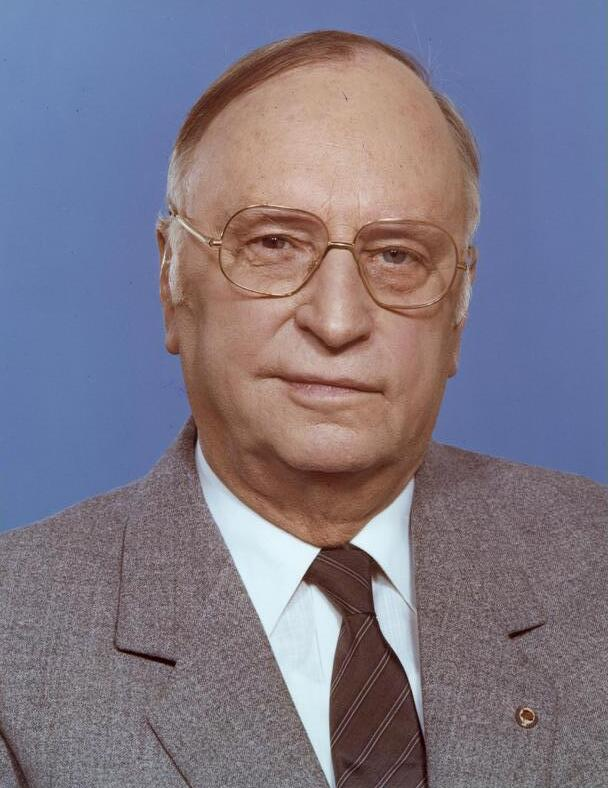
- Hager in 1984

Member of the Volkskammer for Jena-Stadt, Jena-Land, Rudolstadt, Saalfeld
- In office 16 November 1958 – 16 November 1989
- Preceded by: Multi-member district
- Succeeded by: Bernd Voigt

Central Committee Secretariat responsibilities
- 1983–1989: Party Academy Karl Marx
- 1967–1989: Health Policy
- 1963–1989: Culture
- 1957–1989: Education
- 1955–1989: Science

Personal details
- Born: Leonard Kurt Hager; 24 July 1912 Bietigheim, Kingdom of Württemberg, German Empire (now Bietigheim-Bissingen, Baden-Württemberg, Germany)
- Died: 18 September 1998 (aged 86) Berlin, Germany
- Resting place: Zentralfriedhof Friedrichsfelde
- Party: KPD (1930–1946); SED (1946–1989); SED-PDS (1989–1990); DKP (1995–1998)
- Spouse: Sabina Schauer
- Children: 2
- Education: Parteihochschule Karl Marx
- Occupation: Politician; Functionary; Journalist
- Awards: Patriotic Order of Merit; Banner of Labor; Hero of Labour; Order of Karl Marx
- Central institution membership: 1963–1989: Full member, Politburo of the Central Committee; 1959–1963: Candidate member, Politburo of the Central Committee; 1954–1989: Full member, Central Committee; 1950–1966: Candidate member, Central Committee; Other offices held: 1979–1989: Member, National Defence Council; 1976–1989: Member, State Council; 1952–1955: Head, Department for Science of the Central Committee Secretariat; 1949–1952: Head, Department for Propaganda of the Central Committee Secretariat

Leonard Kurt Hager (24 July 1912 – 18 September 1998) was a German communist politician who served a member of the Central Committee of the Socialist Unity Party from 1949 to 1989 and as a member of the Politburo from 1963 to 1989. He was the party's chief ideologist, deciding many cultural and educational policies in East Germany.

== Life ==
Hager was born in Bietigheim, Württemberg, on 24 July 1912, the son of a labourer and a cleaner. After attending primary and secondary school he passed the Abitur in 1931. He was a member of the YMCA and Socialist Student Union. Hager worked as a journalist and joined the Communist Party of Germany in 1930, and the Roter Frontkämpferbund in 1932. In 1933 he took part in a sabotage of Adolf Hitler's first speech on the radio (Stuttgarter Kabelattentat). Hager was arrested and sent to the concentration camp Lager Heuberg. After a brief period of detention, he emigrated in 1936.

Until 1937, he worked as a courier for the Young Communist League of Germany in Switzerland, France and Czechoslovakia. From 1937 to 1939 he participated in the Spanish Civil War as a journalist, where he worked for the Deutscher Freiheitssender 29,8 (German Freedom Broadcaster) and Radio Madrid's foreign program.

In 1939 he was detained in France and then emigrated to England. There he was responsible for the international organization of the KPD active, writing under the pseudonym "Felix Albin". After the outbreak of war, he was interned, first in an internment camp at Huyton near Liverpool, and later on the Isle of Man.

== East Germany ==
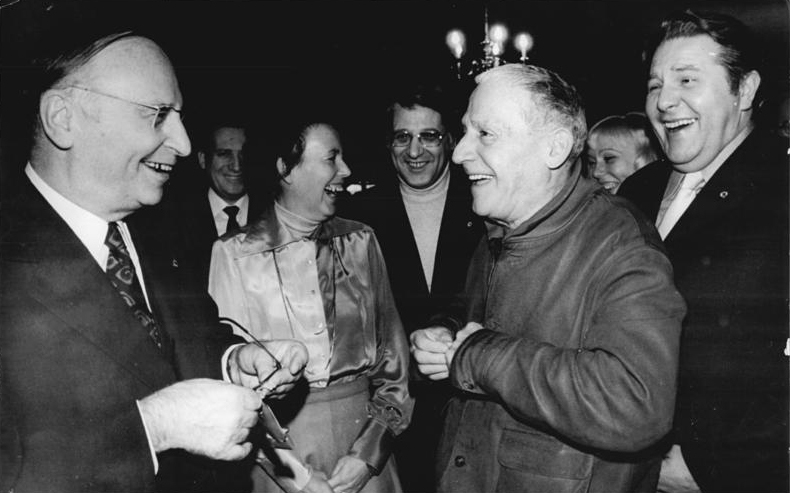
Left to right: Kurt Hager, Ruth Berghaus, Werner Rackwitz, Paul Dessau, and Hans-Joachim Hoffmann in 1974

In 1945 Hager returned to Berlin. Until 1946 he first worked as forestry worker and welder, and later as a journalist for the magazine Freie Tribüne.

Upon his return, he was deputy chief editor of "Vorwärts", the Monday edition of Neues Deutschland. In 1948, Hager graduated the Parteihochschule Karl Marx, qualifying him to be a lecturer. In 1949 he became a full professor for philosophy at the Humboldt University in Berlin.

In 1946 he joined the SED, and became head of the party Training Division, then in 1949 the Head of the Propaganda Department. From 1952 he became the Head of the Science Department of SED, and from 1954 a member of the Central Committee of the SED. In 1955 he became the secretary, and was responsible for science, popular education and culture. A candidate in 1959, from 1963 he was a Member of the Politburo of the CC of SED and the Ideology committee of the Politburo. In 1958 he became a member of the Volkskammer and 1967 was made chairman of the Public Education Committee. He was also between 1976 and 1989 a Member of the Council of State and between 1979 and 1989 a member of the National Defense Council. In the SED-Politbüro Hager was "Chefideologe" and ultimately responsible for culture.

In speeches and writings Hager denied the existence of a single German cultural nation and a common German history. In 1987, in an interview with the German magazine Stern about the reforms of Mikhail Gorbachev in the Soviet Union, Hager gave the answer: "Would you, if your neighbor repapers his apartment, feel like you should also repaper your apartment?". This rejection of the policy of glasnost and perestroika of the Soviet military power met an angry reception both in the party base, as well as in the population of the GDR. Wolf Biermann titled Hager — probably due to this occasion, in his song "The Ballad of the corrupt old men" scornfully as "Professor Tapeten-Kutte". In an encounter with East German journalists spontaneously visiting his residence at "Wachobjekt Wandlitz", Hager claimed he was placed there against his will at the climax of the Cold War. He had "submitted to the decisions of the party," said Hager in the presence of his wife. He described Wandlitz, which after 1989 became a symbol of the duplicity of East German leaders, as the seventh internment camp in his life.

In November 1989 Hager was removed from his functions, and in 1990 expelled from the SED-PDS.

Hager won numerous awards. He received 1956 Hans-Beimler-Medaille, 1962 Banner of Labor, 1964 Vaterländischer Verdienstorden, 1969 entitled Hero of Labour, as well as 1972, 1977 and 1982 Order of Karl Marx.

His daughter Nina Hager, joined somewhat in the footsteps of her father. She is vice chairman of the German Communist Party (DKP), a member of the National Executive and there are other positions.

Hager died in Berlin in 1998. His grave is located on the Zentralfriedhof Friedrichsfelde.
