= Hero of Labour (East Germany) =

Hero of Labor
- Held der Arbeit
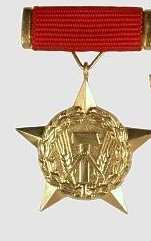
- Awarded for: Economic output
- Date: October 13, 1950
- Country: East Germany
- Reward: 10,000 marks
- Ribbon

The title Hero of Labor (German: Held der Arbeit) was awarded by the German Democratic Republic for supporting the socialist economy, usually by increasing factory output or agricultural yields. It was instituted on 19 April 1950 and was limited to 50 awards per year. A cash prize of up to 10,000 Marks was linked to each award.

== Recipients ==
- Hermann Axen
- Franz Dahlem
- Fritz Dallmann
- Luise Ermisch
- Kurt Hager
- Horst Heintze
- Adolf Hennecke
- Margot Honecker
- Erich Mielke
- Günter Mittag
- Willi Stoph
- Josef Wenig
- Ernst Wulf
- Solveig Leo

== See also ==
- Orders, decorations, and medals of East Germany
- Hero of Socialist Labour
- Hero of Labor (Vietnam)
- Hero of Labor (North Korea)
