= Margot Honecker =

East German politician (1927–2016)

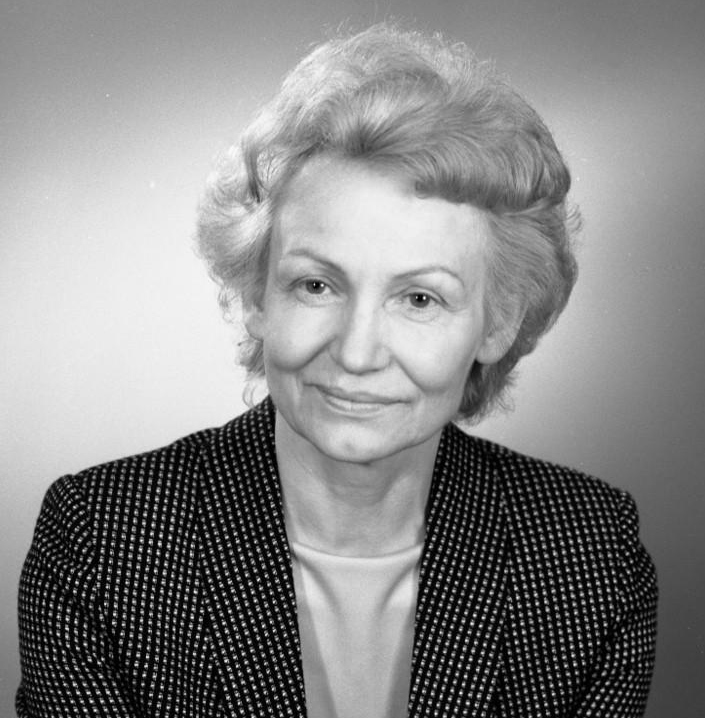
- Honecker in 1986

First Lady of the German Democratic Republic
- In role 29 October 1976 – 18 October 1989
- President: Erich Honecker
- Preceded by: Alice Stoph
- Succeeded by: Erika Krenz

Minister of People's Education
- In office 14 November 1963 – 2 November 1989
- Chairman of the Council of Ministers: Otto Grotewohl; Horst Sindermann; Willi Stoph
- Deputy: See list: Karl Dietzel; Rudolf Parr; Ernst Machacek; Werner Engst; Günther Fuchs; Karl-Heinz Höhn
- Preceded by: Alfred Lemmnitz
- Succeeded by: Günther Fuchs (acting)

Chairman of the Ernst Thälmann Pioneer Organisation
- In office December 1949 – August 1955
- Preceded by: Kurt Morgenstern
- Succeeded by: Heinz Plöger

Member of the Volkskammer for Halle/Saale, Halle-Neustadt
- In office 15 October 1950 – 16 November 1989
- Preceded by: Constituency established
- Succeeded by: Elke Gerhardt

Personal details
- Born: Margot Feist; 17 April 1927 Halle (Saale), Province of Saxony, Free State of Prussia, Weimar Republic (now Saxony-Anhalt, Germany)
- Died: 6 May 2016 (aged 89) Santiago, Chile
- Resting place: Parque del Recuerdo, Santiago
- Party: Communist Party of Germany (1990) (1990–2016)
- Other political affiliations: Party of Democratic Socialism (1989–1990); Socialist Unity Party (1946–1989); Communist Party of Germany (1945–1946)
- Spouse: Erich Honecker (m. 1953; died 1994)
- Children: Sonja Honecker (b. 1952)
- Occupation: Politician; Civil Servant; Commercial Clerk; Telephone Operator
- Awards: Patriotic Order of Merit; Hero of Labour; Order of Karl Marx; Order of Rubén Darío
- Central institution membership: 1963–1989: Full member, Central Committee; 1950–1963: Candidate member, Central Committee; Other offices held: 1948–1949: Member, German People's Congress

Margot Honecker (née Feist; 17 April 1927 – 6 May 2016) was an East German politician and influential member of the country's Communist government until 1989. From 1963 until 1989, she was Minister of National Education (Ministerin für Volksbildung) of the German Democratic Republic (GDR). She was married to Erich Honecker, leader of East Germany's ruling Socialist Unity Party from 1971 to 1989 and concurrently from 1976 to 1989 the country's head of state.

Margot Honecker was widely referred to as the "Purple Witch" ("Lila Hexe" in German) for her tinted hair and hardline Stalinist views. She was responsible for the enactment of the "Uniform Socialist Education System" in 1965 and mandatory military training in schools to prepare pupils for a future war with the west. She was alleged to have been responsible for the regime's forced adoption of children of jailed dissidents or people who attempted to flee the GDR, and is considered to have "left a cruel legacy of separated families." Honecker also established highly controversial youth disciplinary institutions which housed several thousand juvenile offenders between 1964 and 1989, the most notorious of which was located at Torgau. She was one of the few spouses of a ruling Communist Party leader who held significant power in her own right, as her prominence in the regime predated her husband's ascension to the leadership of the SED.

Following the downfall of the communist regime in 1990, Honecker fled to the Soviet Union with her husband to avoid criminal charges from the government of reunified Germany. Their asylum pleas were never acted upon in light of similar problems befalling the Soviet government. Fearing extradition to Germany, they took refuge in the Chilean embassy in Moscow in 1991, but the following year her husband was extradited to Germany by Yeltsin's Russian government to face criminal trial, and detained in the Moabit prison. Margot Honecker then fled from Moscow to Chile to avoid a similar fate. At the time of her death, she lived in Chile with her daughter Sonja.

== Early life ==
Honecker was born Margot Feist in Halle on 17 April 1927, the daughter of a shoemaker, Gotthard Feist (1906–1993), and a factory worker, Helene Feist (c. 1906–1940). Her parents were members of Communist Party of Germany (KPD). Her father was imprisoned in Lichtenburg concentration camp in the 1930s and from 1937 until 1939 in Buchenwald concentration camp. Gestapo agents searched the family apartment for evidence of subversive activities on several occasions. After graduating from elementary school, she was a member of the Nazi Party's girls' organisation Bund Deutscher Mädel, in which membership was compulsory, from 1938 to 1945. Her mother died in 1940 when Margot was 13 years old.

Her brother Manfred Feist later became the leader of the Foreign Information department within the party's Central Committee.

== Party ==
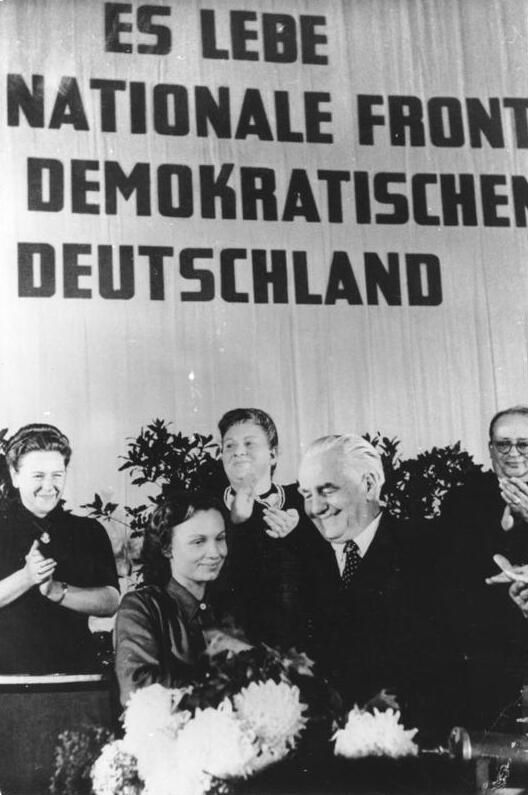
Honecker congratulates Wilhelm Pieck on his election as the first GDR President in 1949.

In 1945, Margot Feist joined the KPD. After April 1946, with the contentious merger of the SPD and KPD, she became a member of East Germany's next ruling party, the Socialist Unity Party (Sozialistische Einheitspartei Deutschlands / SED), working in Halle as a shorthand typist with the FDGB (Trades Union Federation) regional executive for Saxony-Anhalt.

In 1946, Feist also joined the regional secretariat of the Free German Youth (FDJ)—effectively the youth wing of the ruling party—in Halle. She then began a meteoric rise through its various departments. In 1947, she became the leader of the culture and education department in the FDJ's regional executive, and in 1948, secretary of the FDJ's central council as well as chairperson of the Ernst Thälmann Pioneer Organisation.

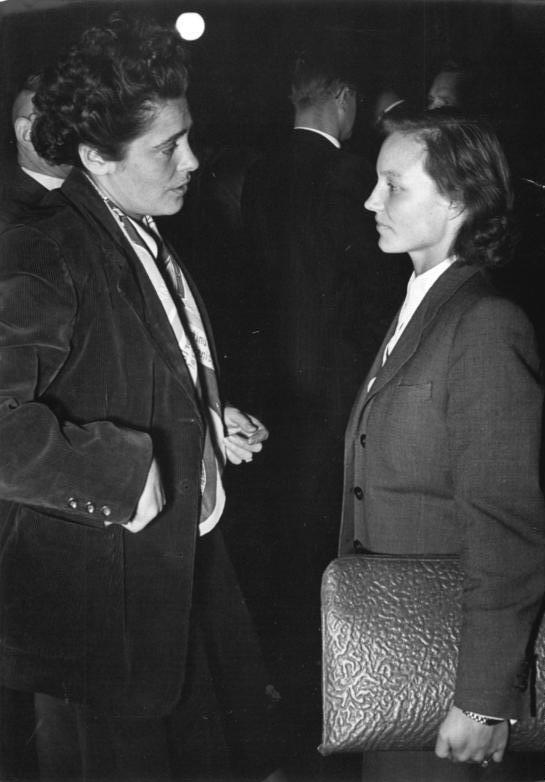
Margot Feist (right) in the Volkskammer, 1951. During this period, she was having an affair with Erich Honecker.

By 1949, Feist was a member of the GDR's precursor parliament (German: Volksrat). That year, aged 22, she was elected as a representative in the newly founded People's Chamber (German: Volkskammer).

Margot Feist met her future husband, Erich Honecker, at FDJ meetings when he was the chairman of the Freie Deutsche Jugend. Honecker was already married, as well as being fifteen years her senior. The relationship between them developed when Feist, in her capacity as leader of the "Ernst Thälmann young pioneers", joined the East German delegation that traveled to Moscow for the celebration of Stalin's official birthday. The delegation was led by Erich Honecker. After she became pregnant and gave birth to their daughter Sonja in 1952, Honecker divorced his second wife Edith and married Margot.

== Minister of National Education ==
In 1963, Honecker became Minister of National Education (German: Volksbildungsministerin), after a period occupying the office as Acting Minister. On 25 February 1965, she introduced the law that made "the uniform socialist education system" standard in all schools, colleges and universities throughout East Germany.

For her work as Minister of National Education, Honecker was awarded the Order of Karl Marx, the nation's highest award, in 1977.

In 1978, Honecker introduced, against the opposition of the churches and many parents, military lessons (German: Wehrkunde) for 9th and 10th grade high school students (this included training on weapons such as aerial guns and the KK-MPi). Her tenure lasted until early November 1989.

Though the accusations were never proven, Honecker was allegedly responsible for the regime's kidnapping and forced adoption of children of jailed dissidents and those who tried to flee the GDR, and she is considered to have "left a cruel legacy of separated families." She dismissed the allegations that she had directed a program of forced adoptions, saying "It didn’t exist". Honecker also established youth disciplinary institutions for juveniles throughout the country which housed approximately 4,000 "difficult youths" between the ages of 14 and 18 from 1964 to 1989. The most notorious of these facilities was the disciplinary home located at Torgau. Those held at the Torgau facility experienced prison-like conditions, endured military-style drills, conducted laborious activities, and there were reported abuses by staff. The criteria for which troubled youth were forcibly sent to Torgau has also been the subject of scholarship and controversy. In contrast, the Federal Republic of Germany imprisoned a significantly higher number of juvenile offenders than East Germany, with 17,982 youths sentenced to detention facilities in the year 1980 alone.

In 1990, charges were made against Honecker as Minister of Education. These included accusations that she had arranged politically motivated arrests, separated children against their will from their parents, and ordered compulsory adoptions of children from persons deemed unreliable by the state.

== Loss of power ==
During the Peaceful Revolution of 1989, Honecker briefly remained in office after her husband's ousting as leader of the Socialist Unity Party in October 1989. However, as part of the regime's effort to rehabilitate itself under her husband's successor, Egon Krenz, Honecker was sacked from cabinet on 2 November. On 4 February 1990, she resigned from the Party of Democratic Socialism, successor of the SED; her husband had been expelled two months earlier. She later joined the newly refounded Communist Party of Germany (KPD).

== Flight to Moscow and Chile ==
A new arrest warrant against Erich Honecker was issued in December 1990, but there was no immediate arrest. In March 1991, the couple were flown in a Soviet military jet to Moscow from the Sperenberg Airfield near Berlin. As soon as they arrived in Moscow, Margot's husband was taken directly to a Red Army hospital where his cancer was diagnosed. The two of them were then installed in a government dacha and treated as honoured guests, while one by one their Kremlin allies fell from power. Boris Yeltsin was already busy building up his power base in Moscow, and Erich Honecker's desperate last letter to President Gorbachev went unanswered.

In August 1991, as the Soviet Union collapsed, the Honeckers, fearing they might find themselves handed over to the German authorities, took refuge in the Chilean embassy, where for nearly a year they lived out of a suitcase in a small room.

They hoped to be able to fly directly from Moscow to a Chilean exile, but the German government had other ideas. The Russian leadership refused to become involved: it fell to German Chancellor Helmut Kohl and Chilean President Patricio Aylwin to negotiate a future for the Honeckers. There was public and political pressure in Germany for the East German leadership to be held accountable for the killings of people attempting to escape over the Berlin Wall between 1961 and 1989, while Chile had itself only recently emerged from dictatorship: Margot's own son-in-law was one among several thousand Chilean political dissidents from the Pinochet years who had reason to be grateful to the old East German political establishment that had welcomed them as political exiles during the 1970s and 1980s.

Formally, the negotiations between Kohl and Aylwin were defined by tensions between the Chilean determination to uphold the Honeckers' right to political asylum and Germany's legal agreements on extradition: for some months, the discussions were characterised by mutual intransigence. In the end, on 29 July 1992, Erich Honecker was sent on a special flight to face trial in Berlin. Margot Honecker was permitted to fly to Santiago to join her daughter Sonja and her family, who had been living in Chile since 1990.

== Post-GDR exile ==
After 1992, Margot Honecker lived in Santiago, Chile, with her daughter, son-in-law, and grandson: Sonja Honecker de Yáñez, Leo Yáñez Betancourt, and Roberto Yáñez Honecker.

In January 1993, Erich Honecker's trial in Berlin, which some felt had by that stage already descended into farce, was cut short because of the rapidly deteriorating health of the accused. He left Berlin for the last time on 13 March 1993, bound for Chile. Honecker lived with his wife and daughter, whose own twenty-year marriage ended in divorce the year after her parents moved in. He died of liver cancer at the age of 81 on 29 May 1994 in Santiago. His body was cremated.

In 1999, Margot Honecker failed in her legal attempt to sue the German government for €60,300 of property confiscated following reunification. In 2001, her appeal to the European Court of Human Rights failed. She received a survivor's pension and the old-age pension of the German old-age pension insurance federation of about 1,500 euros, which she regarded as insolently sparse.

In 2000, Luis Corvalán, the former General Secretary of the Communist Party of Chile, published the book The Other Germany – the GDR. Discussions with Margot Honecker, in which Honecker speaks about the history of the GDR from her perspective. In the book, they discuss the myths that have arisen about the GDR since the fall of Communism, but also the shared history between Chile and GDR, since the Honeckers received 5000 Chilean refugees fleeing from the Pinochet junta.

On 19 July 2008, on the occasion of the 29th anniversary of the Sandinista revolution in Nicaragua, Honecker was awarded the "Rubén Dario" order for cultural independence from President Daniel Ortega. The award was in recognition of Honecker's untiring support of the national campaign against illiteracy in the 1980s. This honour was Honecker's first public appearance since the fall of the Berlin Wall. Honecker was reported to have said she was grateful for the honour, but said nothing publicly. The left-wing heads of state of Paraguay and Venezuela, Fernando Lugo and Hugo Chávez, also took part in the celebrations in Managua.

To the day she died, Honecker continued to defend the old East Germany and identified herself as a hardline Communist. In October 2009, Honecker celebrated the 60th anniversary of the founding of the GDR with former Chilean exiles who had sought asylum in East Germany. She participated in singing a patriotic East German song and gave a short speech in which she stated that East Germans "had a good life in the GDR" and that many felt that capitalism has made their lives worse. In 2011, author Frank Schuhmann published a book entitled Letzte Aufzeichnungen – Für Margot (Final Notes – For Margot) in English, based on the 400-page diary kept by Erich Honecker during his stay in Berlin's Moabit prison beginning in July 1992. The diary was given to the author by Margot Honecker.

On 2 April 2012, Honecker gave an interview during which she defended the GDR, attacked those who helped to "destroy" it, and complained about her pension. She felt that there was no need for people to climb over the Berlin Wall and lose their lives. She suggested that the GDR was a good country and that the demonstrations were driven by the GDR's enemies. "The GDR also had its foes. That's why we had the Stasi," she said.

In a 2012 interview with Das Erste, Honecker labelled Mikhail Gorbachev a "traitor" for his reforms and called the defectors of East Germany "criminals and terrorists." She said that the Federal Republic of Germany, the European Union, and the United States would collapse.

== Death ==
Margot Honecker died in Santiago on 6 May 2016, at the age of 89. Her funeral was described by German media as "bizarre", featuring 50 "diehard" communists with East German flags. Victims associations and Roland Jahn, Federal Commissioner for the Stasi Records, criticised the funeral.

== In popular culture ==
Honecker is a recurring antagonist in the 2022 German Netflix spy thriller Kleo. She is played by Steffi Kühnert.

== Awards and honors ==
- East Germany:
  - Hero of Labour, twice (1969 and 1984)
  - Patriotic Order of Merit, gold (1964)
  - Order of Karl Marx, twice (1977 and 1987)
- Polish People's Republic:
  - Honorary doctorate from Adam Mickiewicz University (1974)
- Nicaragua:
  - Order of Augusto Cesar Sandino, 1st class
  - Order of Rubén Dario (2008)
- Soviet Union:
  - Order of Friendship of Peoples

== Gallery ==
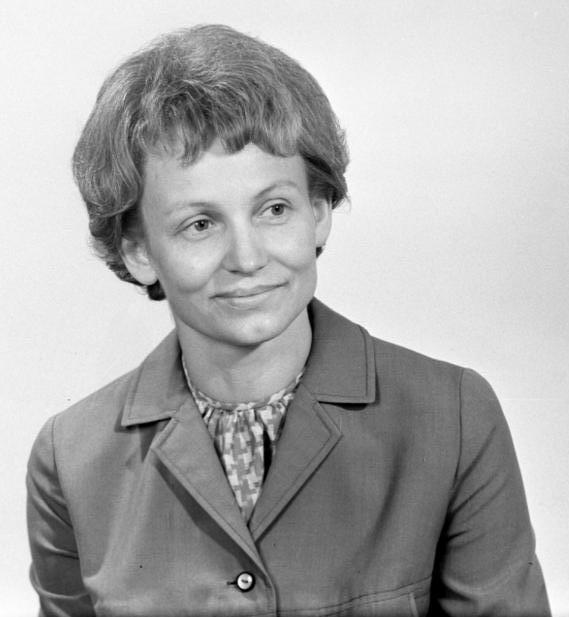
An official portrait taken in July 1967, when Honecker was 40 years old

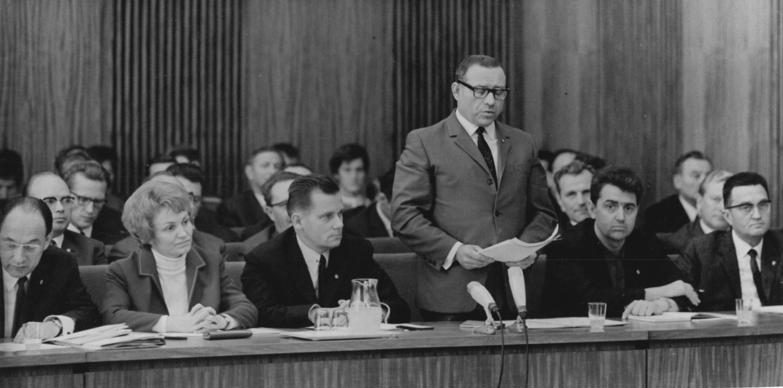
Minister of Education Margot Honecker listens as Assistant Secretary for Culture and Sport Roland Weissig addresses the 11th Council of State meeting in 1968.

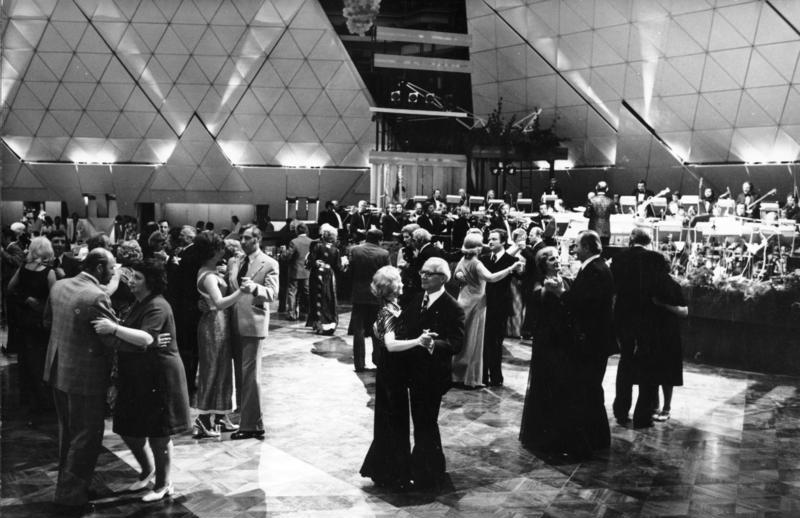
In 1976, the Honeckers attend the banquet-ball for the opening of the Palace of the Republic in East Berlin.

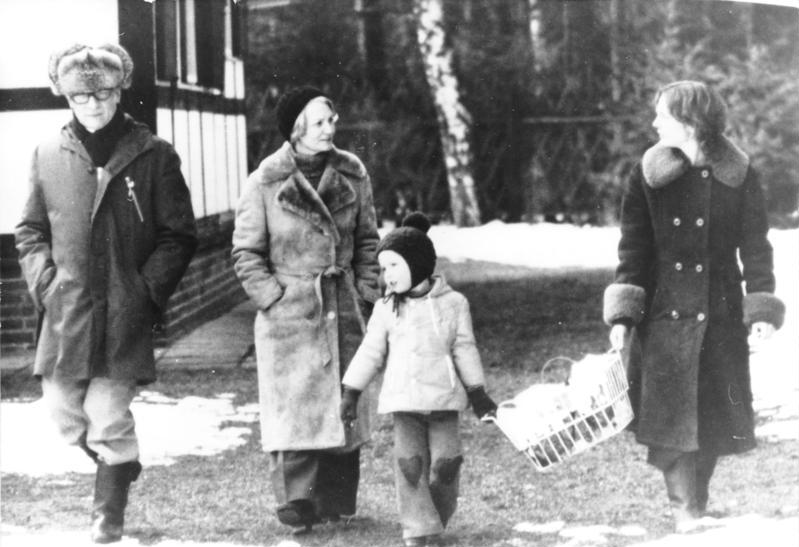
Erich Honecker and his wife take a walk with their daughter Sonja and grandson Roberto around the Waldsiedlung in 1977.

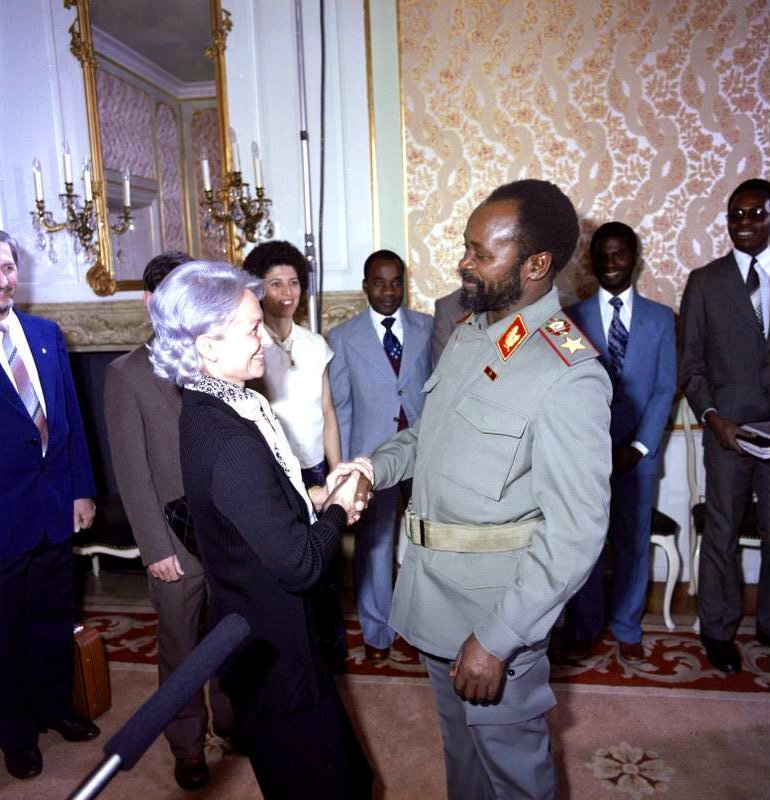
Honecker meeting Mozambican military commander and revolutionary socialist leader Samora Machel in 1983.

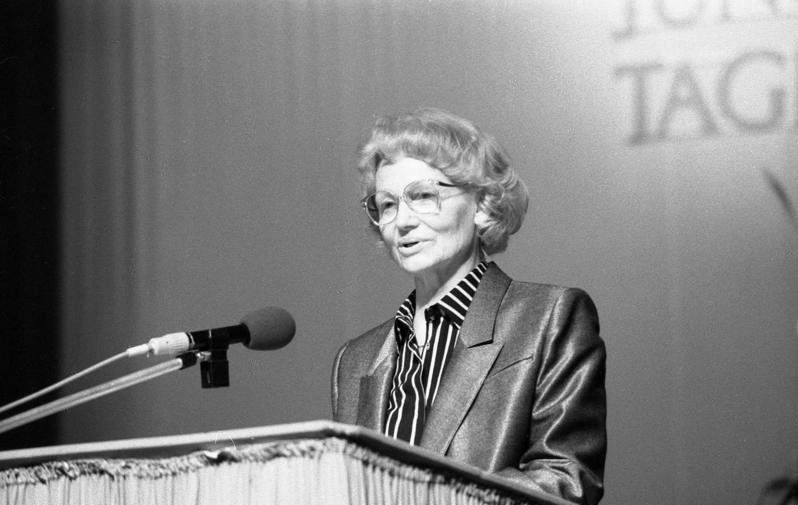
Honecker, as the GDR's Minister of People's Education, speaking in Potsdam in 1988, a year before the Revolutions of 1989.

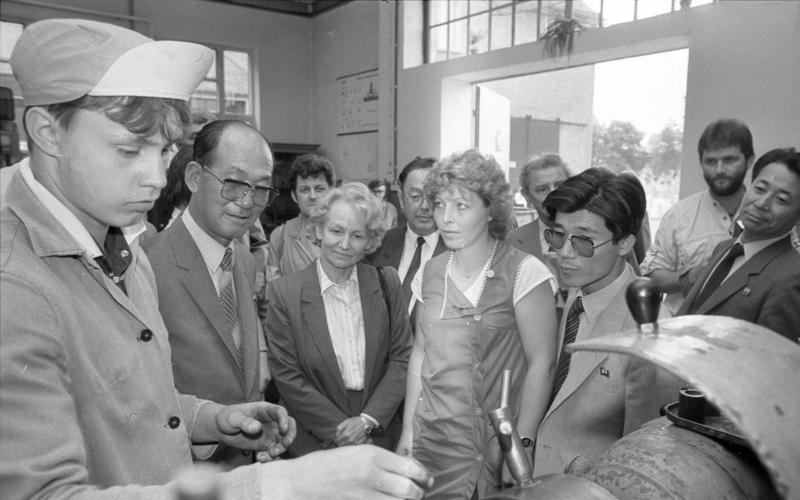
Honecker touring a technical-skills polytechnic (Polytechnisches Zentrum) at Rothenschirmbach with North Korea's Education Minister in 1988.

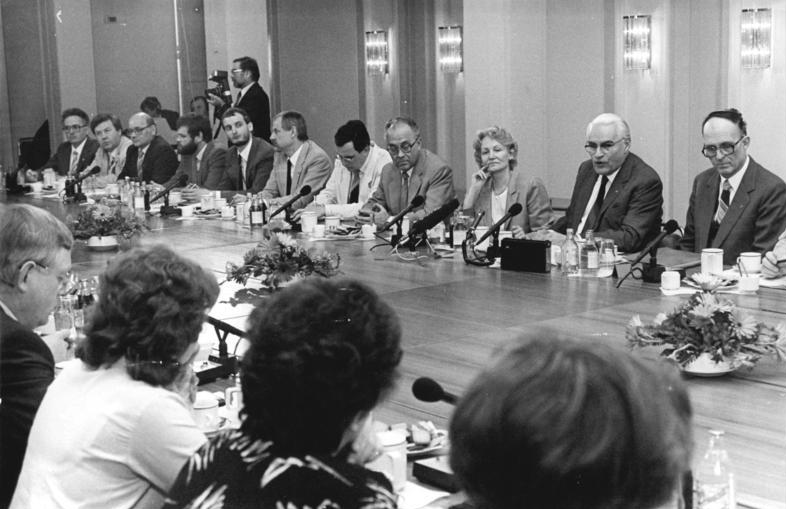
Honecker hosting an educational congress at the headquarters of the Christian Democrats in April 1989, seven months before the Berlin Wall fell.
