= Fred Oelßner =

German politician (1903–1977)

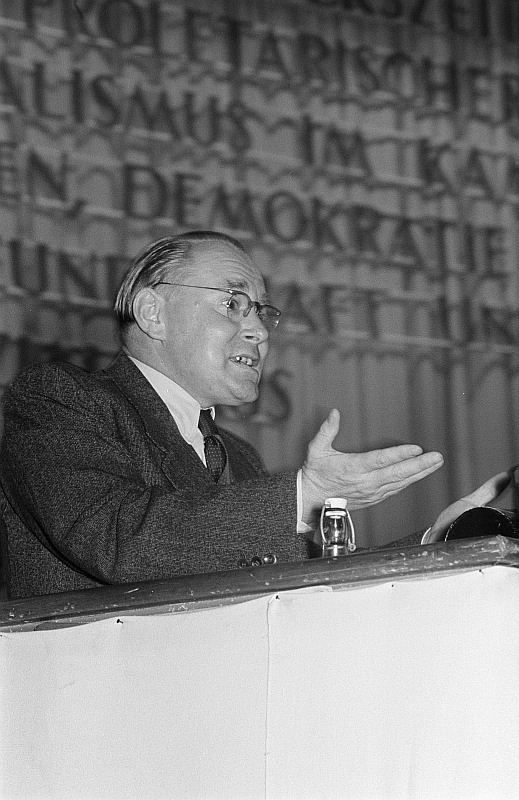
- Oelßner delivers a speech, 1954

Deputy Minister-President of the Council of Ministers
- In office 18 January 1956 – 8 February 1958
- Minister-President: Otto Grotewohl
- Preceded by: Multi-member position
- Succeeded by: Multi-member position

Member of the Volkskammer
- In office 30 May 1949 – 8 March 1958
- Preceded by: Multi-member district
- Succeeded by: Multi-member district

Central Committee Secretariat (Note: Party Executive Committee Central Secretariat until July 1950.) responsibilities
- 1949–1955: Propaganda
- 1949–1955: Science
- 1949–1950: Culture
- 1949–1955: Institute for Marxism-Leninism
- 1949–1955: Party Academy "Karl Marx"
- 1950–1955: Academy for Social Sciences
- 1950–1953: Einheit
- 1953–1955: Agitation

Personal details
- Born: 27 February 1903 Leipzig, Kingdom of Saxony, German Empire
- Died: 7 November 1977 (aged 74) East Berlin, East Germany
- Party: USPD (1919–1920); KPD (1920–1946); SED (after 1946)
- Spouse(s): 1. Tatjana Nikolajewna Tschewskaja; 2. Dora Langbecker; 3. Nina _____
- Children: 3
- Parent(s): Alfred Oelßner; Anna _____
- Education: Institute of Red Professors; International Lenin School
- Occupation: Politician; Economist; Professor
- Known for: Politburo membership and expulsion
- Awards: Order of Karl Marx (1973); Patriotic Order of Merit, Honor Clasp in Gold (1965); Patriotic Order of Merit, Gold 1st Class (1955); National Prize of the German Democratic Republic (1949)
- Central institution membership: 1950–1958: Full member, Politburo of the Central Committee; 1947–1958: Full member, Central Committee (Note: Party Executive Committee until 1950)

Fred Oelßner (27 February 1903 – 7 November 1977) was a German communist politician, economist and a leading political figure in the German Democratic Republic (East Germany). He served as secretary of several departments of the ruling Socialist Unity Party of Germany (SED), specializing in cultural and academic matters.

Oelßner became a member of the SED Politburo in 1950. He fell out of favour over the so-called Schirdewan affair in 1958, however, and was excluded from the politburo. Tensions had arisen at the top of government over the extent which the country should be willing to respond positively to pressure from Moscow for a measure of De-Stalinization. Oelßner was able to argue from an economic and political perspective in favour of a cautious easing of restrictions. After a period of a year or so during which it might have been thought that the East German leader, Walter Ulbricht, was open to suggestions, the political downfall of Karl Schirdewan, Fred Oelßner, and other functionaries, were seen as a sign that traditionalist economic hardliners would remain in control. In September 1959 Oelßner published his self-criticism on account of his "opportunism and political blindness" ("Opportunismus und politische Blindheit") during the years 1956/57.

== Life ==
=== Provenance and early years ===
Fred Oelßner was born in Leipzig. Alfred Oelßner, his father, was an activist member of the Social Democratic Party, and later became a prominent Communist Party activist and official. His mother worked in the garments business. After attending middle school at nearby Weißenfels Oelßner remained in Weißenfels, where he embarked on an apprenticeship in business and milling at the Beuditz Mill between 1917 and 1919. At the same time he continued his education, attending evening classes at a business school.

=== Politicisation ===
He joined the Young Socialists ("Sozialistische Arbeiter-Jugend" / SAJ) in 1917 and the Free Young Socialists ("Freie sozialistische Jugend" / FSJ) in 1918. He was dismissed from his apprenticeship after eighteen month in account of his "political activities". Despite still only being sixteen, Oelßner joined the Independent Social Democratic Party ("Unabhängige Sozialdemokratische Partei Deutschlands" / USPD) in May 1919. The party had been formed a couple of years earlier as the result of a split in the mainstream SPD. At that point the principal cause of the split had been the decision by the SPD leadership to vote in support of funding for the war. By 1919 the war was over and economic hardship was leading to increased political polarisation. The Russian Revolution of 1917 had appeared to open up the possibilities for similar developments in Germany. The Communist Party of Germany was founded at a congress held in Berlin during three days between 30 December 1918 and 1 January 1919. Over the next year or so it was the turn of the USPD to break apart, with the majority of is members joining the newly formed Communist Party. However, the USPD seems to have remained relatively active in the Halle-Merseburg locality (where Oelßner was based) through 1920, and it was only in December 1920 that he formally joined the Communist Party. During this period he supported himself with an office job at a co-operative enterprise in Halle till 1921. At the same time he served as a local team leader ("Bezirksleiter") for the Socialist Proletarian Youth organisation ("Sozialistische Proletarierjugend") and for the Young Communists in the Halle-Merseburg locality.

In 1921 Oelßner took part in the so-called March Action, a short-lived workers' revolt in central Germany. He then accepted a paid job, working for the Communist Party Central Committee under the direction of Wilhelm Koenen and Walter Stoecker. From Autumn 1921 till January 1922 he worked as a volunteer with the "Hamburgische Volkszeitung" (newspaper). During 1922/23 he undertook an editorial role with the "Schlesische Arbeiterzeitung", based in Breslau (as Wrocław was then known). Further editorial postings on left-wing newspapers followed in Chemnitz, Aachen and Stuttgart. It was in Stuttgart that he was arrested in December 1923. He faced trial in September 1924 at the Supreme Court in Leipzig and was sentenced to a year in prison. The charge was the usual one under such circumstances of "preparing to commit high treason" ("Vorbereitung zum Hochverrat"). Most of his sentence had already been expunged during his pretrial detention and he was released from prison in Cottbus in January 1925. After this he took further editorial posts in Remscheid and Aachen.

=== Moscow ===
He was sent by the party to Moscow in April 1926 and joined the Soviet Communist Party the same year. In Moscow he studied at the Comintern's newly established International Lenin School between 1926 and 1928. He remained at the school in 1929, now as an "Aspirant" (loosely "graduate student"). After that, he undertook a higher degree course at the Economics Faculty at the Institute of Red Professors ("Институт красной профессуры"). He returned to Germany in the summer of 1932 and worked in Berlin under Ernst Schneller in the Propaganda Department of the party central committee. His areas of responsibility included party training, and he himself taught at the party's "Rosa Luxemburg Party Academy ("Reichsparteischule Rosa Luxemburg") at Schöneiche-Fichtenau, just outside the city.

=== Nazi Germany ===
In January 1933 the Nazi Party took power and lost little time in transforming the country into a one-party dictatorship. The party had gained support on the traditional populist pillars of hope and hatred. After the Reichstag fire at the end of February 1933 the authorities became particularly focused on those with a record of Communist Party activism. The party was progressively banned and by the middle of the summer most active communists had been arrested (or worse) or had fled abroad. Fred Oelßner managed to remain in Berlin till December 1933, however. Both his continuing presence - presumably unregistered - and his continuing "party work" are identified in sources as "illegal". In December 1933 he emigrated to the Saarland, which at this point had not yet been re-integrated into Germany. Here he undertook "education" on behalf of the Party Central Committee. By 1934 he was in Paris which was rapidly becoming one of the two headquarter locations of the German Communist Party in exile. In Paris he worked closely with Walter Ulbricht, a future leader of East Germany. At least one source describes Oelßner during 1934 as "Ulbricht's secretary" in Paris. He also headed up "party education" in Amsterdam, Zürich and Paris.

=== Back in Moscow ===
In 1935 he was one of several exiled German Communists who relocated from Paris to Moscow, where by March 1935 he had accepted an invitation to become a teacher at the Communist University of the National Minorities of the West and at the International Lenin School. The decision to close down the Communist University of the National Minorities of the West was taken in May 1936. In August 1936 Oelßner was dismissed from his teachings posts on account of alleged ideological deviations. The years 1936 - 1938 saw the Stalinist purges at their peak. Many hundred German political refugees from Nazism were arrested and accused of Trotskyite sympathies. Some were shot. Some were sent to labour camps and/or banished to remote regions of the Soviet Unions for many years. Oelßner experienced the period as an unemployed refugee in Moscow, supporting himself as best he could with freelance translating and writing. There are suggestions that he was fortunate to suffer nothing worse. In September 1938 he obtained work in charge of the planning department at the so-called "Bop" Paper Mill in Moscow. He retained this job till June 1941.

=== Soviet citizen ===
In March 1940 Fred Oelßner was granted Soviet citizenship. A factor was that he was by now married. His first wife was Russian and a Soviet citizen when he married her. His Soviet passport and other identity documents issued to him gave him a new name, "Fritz Larew". Back in Germany, Gestapo files from the start of 1941 list Oelßner as one of their Special manhunt targets (in der "Sonderfahndungsliste") within the Soviet Union.

Between June 1941 and Autumn 1944 he worked in Kuybyshev as an editor, and then as a chief editor, in the German language section of Moscow Radio. (In October 1941, the Communist Party and governmental organisations, diplomatic missions of foreign countries, leading cultural establishments and their staff were evacuated to Kuybyshe, but contingency preparations had been in place for such a move from at least as far back as the start of the war.) Early in 1943 he also became a member of a working group set up by the party leadership dealing with propaganda issues. By the end of 1944 the government apparatus had been back in Moscow for more than a year, and Fred Oelßner with it. Between February and August 1944 he served as a member of an important working group planning a postwar programme for the (German) Communist Party. He was also a member of a smaller sub-group on the "trades union role". In September 1944 he took a teaching position at the German party's "Party Academy Nbr. 12" under the direction of Heinz Hoffmann, just outside Moscow. The school's "pupils" were German prisoners of war.

=== Soviet occupation zone ===
By the time war ended in May 1945 there were many thousands of Germans in the Soviet Union. No one knew how many. Most were prisoners of war. Others were political refugees who had fled to Moscow in the 1930s to escape from Hitler, and then fallen foul of the purges. Many were in labour camps or in internal exile far from Moscow and would never return to Germany. Of the thousands who did make it back, most would first be detained in the Soviet Union for another two to ten years. However, thirty men, who had spent the war years in Moscow, experienced a very different homecoming. Fred Oelßner was one of them. On 30 April 1945 a Soviet aircraft flew the thirty men from Moscow to Minsk, and from there to an airfield at Kalau just outside Meseritz. From there they were taken in a truck to Bruchmühle where the Soviet military commander, Marshal Zhukov had set up his headquarters some twenty miles to the east of Berlin. The ten man Ulbricht Group started work on 2 May 1945 while the ten men led by Gustav Sobottka made their way to Mecklenburg in the northern party of what was now to become known as the Soviet occupation zone. Fred Oelßner was a member of the ten man Ackermann Group who now installed themselves in eastern Saxony. Much later it became clear that the thirty men who arrived from Moscow at the start of May 1945 had arrived with a remarkably detailed "nation building" plan. The first task was to prepare the groundwork for the re-establishment of communist organizations and unions in postwar Germany, with the focus on the area to be administered by the Soviet Union according to a military division of the western two thirds of Germany that had already been agreed between Germany's leading wartime enemies. The Ackermann Group made a slower start than the other two groups, however, since much the southern portion of the future Soviet occupation zone, including Leipzig had been liberated, after fierce fighting, by US forces, leaving the Soviet forces to concentrate on Berlin and the north of Germany. It was only in July 1945 that the American forces withdrew to the pre-agreed frontier. Slightly further to the east Dresden capitulated to the Red army on 8 May 1945, the day (according to most Anglo-American sources) of the official surrender. In Dresden Fred Oelßner became the editor of a Red army "Daily newspaper for the German population". That appointment lasted only a few weeks, however. In June 1945 he was transferred to Berlin. His mandate now, from the Communist Party Central Committee was to create and head up the party's important Agitprop department.

The Socialist Unity Party ("Sozialistische Einheitspartei Deutschlands" / SED) was launched in April 1946, created through a contentious merger of the old Communist Party and (if only, for most purposes, within the Soviet occupation zone) the more moderately left-wing Social Democratic Party. During 1946 Oelßner was employed by the new party's national executive committee ("Parteivorstand") as head of the party education department. In 1947 he himself became a member of the national executive which quickly became (and was renamed as) the Party Central Committee. Within the Central Committee, between October 1947 and February 1949 he took on responsibility for a newly expanded department covering not just party education but also culture and schooling. Former Social Democrats in the party leadership were quickly squeezed out and the SED came to resemble a Soviet-style communist party in all but name. By the time the Soviet occupation zone was relaunched, in October 1949, as the Soviet sponsored German Democratic Republic (East Germany), the SED was firmly in place as the ruling party in a new kind of German one-party dictatorship. Fred Oelßner was nominated to membership of the People's Council ("Volksrat") in May 1949 and was "elected" a member of its successor body, the People's Parliament ("Volkskammer") later that year. The German Democratic Republic operated according to a highly centralised power structure: power resided not with any legislative assembly, nor even with government ministers, but with the Central Committee of the ruling party. However, the party's dominating role was concealed to the extent that Central Committee members were frequently also members of the Volkskammer and/or appointed as government ministers. In 1950 Oelßner joined the inner caucus of the Central Committee, known under the Leninist power structure of the new country as the politburo.

=== German Democratic Republic ===
Oelßner was in office between 1950 and 1955 as Central Committee Secretary for Propaganda. He worked till 1956 as editor-in-chief of Einheit (loosely "Unity"), a prestigious academic monthly journal published by the party, devoted to "the theory and practice of economic socialism". Till 1958 he was effectively the party's chief ideologue. In December 1951 he was appointed to headship of the teaching chair for Political Economics at the Central Committee Academy for Social Sciences. Under other circumstances this might have been seen as a full-time position and the basis for a long-term academic career, but in Oelßner's case sources stress that at this time most of the daily jobs associated with the post would have been delegated to others. In 1953 he became a member of the German Academy of Sciences ("Deutsche Akademie der Wissenschaften zu Berlin").

Thanks to his outstanding fluency in Russian, combined with his high political offices in the East German political hierarchy, during the first part of the 1950s Oelßner participated as a simultaneous translator in important discussions involving Walter Ulbricht and Wilhelm Pieck, the East German leaders, with the leadership in Moscow (including Stalin) and with Vladimir Semyonov, head of the Soviet military administration based in Berlin-Karlshorst.

In 1955 he also became a deputy chairman of the Ministerial Council. He also became chair of the Ministerial Council's Commission for Consumer Goods and Public Supplies. In 1956 his academic credentials received a boost when he was appointed to a professorship in Political Economics at the Institute for Social Sciences at the Academy for Social Sciences.

Within the politburo Oelßner had emerged as a critic of plans for the "complete collectivisation of agriculture" which came to enjoy the backing of the "Ulbricht wing" after 1956. In the Soviet Union, following the death of Stalin and the "secret speech" delivered by Nikita Khrushchev in February 1956 (discussion of which was strongly discouraged within East German government circles), a view was developing that the communist regime's longer-term survival might best be secured not simply by repression, fear and rigged election results, but by seeking to win the genuine support of the population. Karl Schirdewan, another of the 12 (or 14) members of the East German politburo, was actually present when Khrushchev delivered his speech at the 20th Congress of the Soviet Communist Party in Moscow. Discussions of the possible desirability of cautiously relaxing state control over society found their way into the East German politburo and for a time, according to some, it seemed that a measure of liberalisation might be possible. It was never clear how widespread those ideas became at the heart of government. Sources originating with East German government always identify (retrospectively) the same three Central Committee dissenters "and others", without ever identifying the others. By early in 1958 Walter Ulbricht had evidently identified a threat to the status quo and possibly to his own political dominance. On 8 February 1958 Fred Oelßner was expelled from the Politburo and relieved of all his political and party offices, accused of "repeated violations of Politburo discipline" ("... wiederholter Verletzung der Disziplin des Politbüros"). Others expelled from the Central Committee were Karl Schirdewan and Ernst Wollweber, accused of "factionalism" and "violations of party rules".

Arguably Fred Oelßner did not fall so low as his fellow Central Committee expellees, Schirdewan and Wollweber. He certainly did not suffer like Paul Merker, another former Politburo member who had incurred Walter Ulbricht's suspicions a couple of years earlier. It may have helped that in September 1959 Oelßner published his self-criticism on account of his "opportunism and political blindness" ("Opportunismus und politische Blindheit") during the years 1956/57. But there was to be no return for Oelßner to frontline politics. Between 1958 and 1969 he headed up the Institute of Economics at the German Academy of Sciences, as its director. Between 1961 and 1968 he was also secretary there for the departments covering Philosophy, Law and Economics. He received an honorary doctorate ("Dr. h. c.") from the Humboldt University of Berlin in 1968.

== Awards and honours (selection) ==
- 1949 National Prize of the German Democratic Republic
- 1955 Patriotic Order of Merit in gold
- 1965 Patriotic Order of Merit gold clasp
- 1973 Order of Karl Marx

The Workers and Farmers Faculty at Jena was renamed in his honour. Between 1952 and 1965 the vast Staßfurt Ammonia-Soda Plant was renamed as the "VEB Sodawerk 'Fred Oelßner' Staßfurt".
