= Edith Baumann =

East German politician (1909–1973)

Edith Baumann Edith Honecker-Baumann
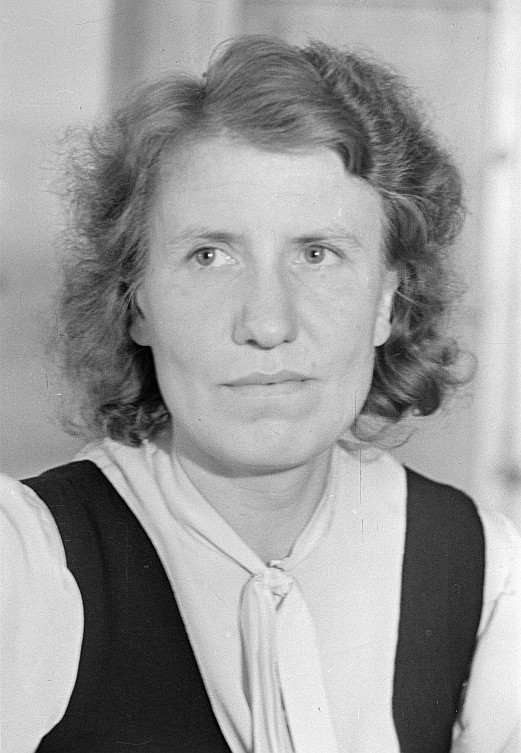
- Baumann in 1946

Secretary of the Magistrate of East Berlin
- In office 11 November 1963 – 7 April 1973
- Lord Mayor: Friedrich Ebert Jr.; Herbert Fechner
- Preceded by: Wilhelm Thiele
- Succeeded by: Hannelore Mensch

Secretary for Trade and Supply of the Central Committee Secretariat
- In office 23 November 1961 – 21 January 1963
- First Secretary: Walter Ulbricht
- Preceded by: Erich Apel
- Succeeded by: Werner Jarowinsky

Head of the Women Department
- In office 1955–1959
- Secretary: Karl Schirdewan; Erich Honecker
- Preceded by: Rosel Naumann (acting)
- Succeeded by: Hilde Krasnogolowy (acting)

Deputy Chairman of the Free German Youth
- In office June 1946 – January 1949
- Chairman: Erich Honecker
- Preceded by: Position established
- Succeeded by: Gerhard Heidenreich

Personal details
- Born: 1 August 1909 Prenzlauer Berg, Berlin, Kingdom of Prussia, German Empire (now Germany)
- Died: 7 April 1973 (aged 63) East Berlin, East Germany
- Party: Socialist Unity Party (1946–1973)
- Other political affiliations: Socialist Workers' Party (1931–1933)
- Spouse: Erich Honecker (m. 1947–1953)
- Children: Erika Honecker (b. 1950)
- Education: CPSU Higher Party School (Dipl.-Ges.-Wiss.)
- Occupation: Politician; Party Functionary; Stenotypist
- Central institution membership: 1958–1963: Candidate member, Politburo of the Central Committee; 1946–1973: Full member, Central Committee (Note: Party Executive Committee until 1950); Other offices held: 1963–1973: Member, East Berlin City Assembly of Deputies

Edith Baumann (1 August 1909 – 7 April 1973) was a German politician. She was a co-founder and official of the Free German Youth (Freie Deutsche Jugend / FDJ), the youth organisation that after 1946 became the youth wing of East Germany's ruling Socialist Unity Party (Sozialistische Einheitspartei Deutschlands / SED). Between 1946 and her death she was a member of the country's powerful Party Central Committee.

Sources sometimes identify her as Edith Honecker-Baumann. Between the late 1940s and early or mid-1950s, sources differing on both the dates of marriage and divorce (see below), she was married to Erich Honecker, at that time the chairman of the Free German Youth organisation, and from 1971 until 1989, General Secretary of the Central Committee of the Socialist Unity Party of Germany, East Germany's leader.

== Life ==
=== Provenance and early years ===
Edith Baumann was born into a working-class family in Prenzlauer Berg, at that time a recently developed district on the southern edge of Berlin. Her father was a building worker. She attended school locally, training as a stenotypist.

Between 1925 and 1929 she was employed as a typist by a pharmacist wholesale supplier: a succession of typing jobs followed. She joined the Socialist Workers' Youth movement (Sozialistische Arbeiter-Jugend / SAJ) in 1925, remaining a member till 1931. Between 1925 and 1933 she was also a member of the Zentralverband der Angestellten (ZdA) trades union. She joined the Socialist Workers' Party of Germany (Sozialistische Arbeiterpartei Deutschlands / SAPD) in 1931, which was the year in which it broke away from the more moderate mainstream Social Democratic Party (Sozialdemokratische Partei Deutschlands / SPD). She was also a leading member of the Socialist Youth League of Germany (Sozialistischer Jugend-Verband Deutschlands / SJV / SJVD ), the youth wing of the SAPD.

=== Nazi Germany ===
The Nazi take-over in January 1933 ushered in a rapid series of social and political changes, as the new government lost little time in creating a one-party dictatorship. Edith Baumann was a political activist in the "wrong" party. At the party conference in March 1933 she was voted on to the party executive of the SAPD, and continued to devote herself actively to what now counted as "illegal party work". During this time, between April and August 1933, she was supporting herself by working as a typist with the "National Agency for Milk Products, Oils and fats" ("Reichsstelle für Milcherzeugnisse, Öle u. Fett") based in Berlin. She was brutally beaten and arrested by the Gestapo in August 1933.

Baumann was detained and tortured while in investigatory custody for more than a year, first in prison at Berlin-Moabit and then at the Barnimstrasse women's prison. She faced trial in December 1934 and was sentenced by the special "people's court" to three years in prison for preparing to commit high treason ("Vorbereitung zum Hochverrat"). In the event she was released in October 1936. She remained in Berlin. Between 1936 and 1938 she was employed as a typist by a Berlin patent attorney. Between 1936 and 1945 she was employed as a book keeper at the company owned by the "Carbon By-products Association" ("Kohlenwertstoff-Verbände").

=== Soviet occupation zone ===
The Second World War ended in Europe in May 1945 with a large area surrounding Berlin administered as the Soviet occupation zone. In September 1945 Edith Baumann was recruited to work with Erich Honecker to establish the Free German Youth (Freie Deutsche Jugend / FDJ) organisation. Although the organisation had roots in the 1930s, this was in most respects a new beginning for an important social and political pillar of the new Germany that the zone's sponsors would create over the next few years. Baumann started out as the FDJ General Secretary and then became its deputy chairman, a position she retained until 1949. The FDJ chairman was Erich Honecker.

Within the Soviet occupation zone the contentious merger, in April 1946, of the Communist Party with the centre-left Social Democratic Party of Germany was intended to avoid the mistakes of 1932 when divisions between the two principal left wing parties were widely believed to have opened the way for the Nazi dictatorship, and both the ensuing war and Holocaust. In the event the new merged party, the Socialist Unity Party (Sozialistische Einheitspartei Deutschlands / SED), would have emerged by 1949 as the ruling party in a new one-party dictatorship. Edith Baumann was a top level party functionary from the outset. In 1946 she became a member both of the SED Party Executive ("Parteivorstand") and of its Central Committee.

=== German Democratic Republic ===
In October 1949 the Soviet occupation zone was relaunched as the German Democratic Republic (East Germany), a separate German state with its political and social institutions consciously modelled on those developed in the Soviet Union during the previous three decades. Between 1949 and 1953 Baumann belonged to the secretariat of the Central Committee, also serving, between 1953 and 1955, as party secretary of the regional party leadership team for Berlin itself. Between 1955 and 1961 she headed up working groups and the central committee Women's Section. The zenith of her career was the period between 1958 and 1963 when she was listed as a candidate member of the Politburo, though she never made the final leap to full Politburo membership. From 1961 till 1963 she was simultaneously also Central Committee secretary with responsibilities over trade and supply, light goods and food products. After this, till 1973, the focus of her political career switched to Berlin where she served as a city councillor and secretary to the city executive group ("Magistrat von Berlin").

Under the Leninist constitutional arrangements in force, political power was concentrated on the party, and within the party on its Central Committee, rather than with ministers or with the national parliament. However, the stark simplicity of the party's supremacy was blurred to the extent that Central Committee members often combined their party roles with ministerial office and/or membership of the national legislature. From its inception in 1947 Edith Baumann herself sat as a member of the German People's Council ("Deutscher Volksrat") and of the East German National Parliament ("Volkskammer") which replaced it in 1949. She retained her parliamentary seat till her death in 1973. Parliamentary seats were allocated according to predetermined quotas by the ruling party not only to itself and the other political parties (which it controlled), but also to certain approved mass organisations. In the early years Baumann sat in the parliament as a member representing the Free German Youth (Freie Deutsche Jugend / FDJ). After 1949 she represented the SED itself in the Volkskammer, however.

In 1947 Edith Baumann was a co-founder of the Democratic Women's League ("Demokratischer Frauenbund Deutschlands" / DFD) which, like the FDJ, was one of the so-called mass organisations with the accompanying "National Front" political privileges such as direct representation in the national parliament "Volkskammer". She remained a member of the DFD national executive till 1964. She was elected to serve on the Women's International Democratic Federation Executive Council in 1953.

== Personal ==
=== Marriage ===
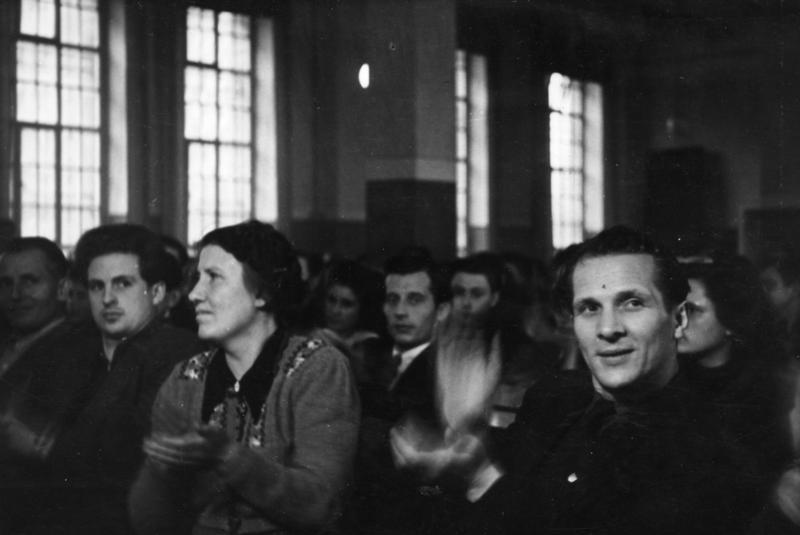
Edith Baumann (centre-left) and Erich Honecker (right) applauding at the Congress of Young Activists of the "Treuhandbetrieb" Weißensee, 13 November 1948

Discussion of Erich Honecker's private life was a constant taboo. The private lives of public figures in East Germany habitually went unremarked. Honecker's relationship with Edith Baumann, his second wife, nevertheless featured sufficiently in the consciousness of East Germany to reappear in the West German political media well before 1971, when Honecker emerged as the new East German leader. When he took over, his marriage to Baumann was already a subject of discussion in the West German press. Understandably, however, a lot of normally mainstream and uncontentious information on the Honecker-Baumann marriage emerged only after 1989, and even now sources differ over quite basic aspects of it.

According to various sources, Erich Honecker married Edith Baumann in 1947. That seems to have been the year in which, after only two years of marriage, his first wife, Charlotte Schanuel, fell ill and died. Other sources assert that the marriage took place at the end of 1949, after Edith discovered she was pregnant with their daughter, Erika.

Erich Honecker was three years younger than Edith Baumann. He was still married to Charlotte in the summer of 1947 when he and Edith travelled together to Moscow. They were already close colleagues through their FDJ and party work, and on the Moscow trip the relationship between the comrades took a new direction. Intimacy ensued. Looking back in 1990 Erich Honecker was measured in his recollections of what happened and how: "At that time I was badly in need of support. We often sat together, also at her home in Mühlenbeck. And she was an ace with the type writer." (Note: "At that time I was badly in need of support. We often sat together, also at her home in Mühlenbeck. And she was an ace with the type writer." "Ich war damals sehr anlehnungsbedürftig. Wir haben oft zusammen gesessen, auch bei ihr zu Hause in Mühlenbeck. Außerdem konnte sie flott Schreibmaschine schreiben."). The later insights offered by Politburo comrade Gerhard Schürer (1921–2010), are also less than generous, though perhaps his directness is a little more striking to an English-language reader than to readers in other mainstream European languages: "I was always a bit baffled ... politically they were of course very well attuned to one another, but in such human terms ... Honecker was a fine looking young man with a good figure, warm eyes and beautiful hair: she came across as a much older, frumpy comrade. (Note: "I was always a bit baffled ... politically they were of course very well attuned to one another, but in such human terms ... Honecker was a fine looking young man with a good figure, warm eyes and beautiful hair: she came across as a much older, frumpy comrade." "Ich habe mich immer ein bisschen gewundert .... weil politisch waren die natürlich ein erfahrenes Paar, aber so menschlich ... Honecker war ein junger hübscher Mann mit einer guten Figur, sie war eine ältlich wirkende Genossin.")

Whatever view Erich Honecker took of matters at the time or subsequently, for Edith their marriage was based on love. However Klaus Herde, a close colleague of the young woman who later became Erich Honcker's third wife, has suggested that Honecker married Edith out of a sense not of love but of duty, when he realised she was pregnant.

Erich and Edith Honecker's marriage ended in 1953 or 1955: again, sources differ. However, since reunification, more information has emerged on what happened.

Assuming that the marriage took place in December 1949, it was just a couple of weeks later that Erich Honecker led a delegation of the East German party to Moscow in order to attend celebrations of the seventieth birthday of the Soviet dictator, Joseph Stalin. The delegation also included Margot Feist, the 22-year-old leader of the Ernst Thälmann Pioneer Organisation. Honecker was fascinated by Feist "both because she was a pretty young girl and because she was very active in the party". Intimacy ensued. It is reported that Honecker attempted to conceal their affair, but he failed because almost every night he went directly to Feist's apartment. Edith did not acquiesce, however. For most purposes, by this time the most powerful German in East German politics was the General Secretary of the Party Central Committee, Walter Ulbricht. Ulbricht now received a letter from Baumann asking him to have a very firm word with his ambitious, philandering young comrade, her husband, saying "Erich never gets home before one in the morning, his head is starting to cave in and he fantasizes about the wildest stuff..." (Note: "Erich never gets home before one in the morning, his head is starting to cave in and he fantasizes about the wildest stuff..." "Erich kommt nie vor ein Uhr nachts nach Hause und phantasiert das wildeste Zeug ...")

Walter Ulbricht was appalled by Honecker's affair. Unaware at this stage that news of his affair with Feist had reached Ulbricht, Honecker was summoned to visit the General Secretary at his weekend retreat north of Berlin. Baumann had written persuasively that Ulbricht should cut off her husband's lover from her important youth work ("aus der Jugendarbeit ausscheiden") and send her away from Berlin. Feist's biographer, Ed Stuhler, believes that the extra-marital romance constituted a huge threat to the political careers of both lovers. But old President Pieck took a more pragmatic view. Despite his declining health and diminishing involvement in day-to-day affairs, Pieck never lost the full confidence of Joseph Stalin. In the judgement of Politburo member Gerhard Schürer it was largely down to Pieck that the ending of Erich and Edith Honecker's marriage ran its jagged course without erupting into scandal. Margot Feist held on to her job and remained in Berlin. Whenever Feist's name was mentioned in Pieck's presence, he developed a twinkle in his eye.

In the summer of 1952, the "unruly partnership" ("wilde Ehe") of comrades Honecker and Feist even came up in the Politburo. Under "Agenda Item 20" the two of them were authorized to take a holiday together in the Soviet Union, but the parties were also instructed to come up with a rapid clarification of their relationships. Honecker was at this point still sharing an apartment with his wife Edith and their daughter Erika, born in 1950. But now it was Margot who was visibly pregnant with Erich's daughter: Sonja would be born at the beginning of December 1952.

It was not until January 1955 that Edith Honecker-Baumann agreed to give her husband a divorce. Soon after this Honecker married Margot Feist. Three years later the new couple moved into the residential quarter of Berlin-Wandlitz, the residential suburb of choice for upwardly mobile politburo members. According to her biographer, Ed Stuhler, Margot Honecker officially was always deeply embarrassed over the duration of the couple's premarital cohabitation. She was not embarrassed however, over how she used her relationships to later reach the pinnacle of power in East Germany.

=== Death ===
Edith Baumann died in East Berlin on 7 April 1973. Erich Honecker led the mourning at her funeral. The urn containing her ashes was placed in the section of the Berlin Main Cemetery reserved for political leaders and others highly honoured by the East German political establishment.

== Awards and honours ==
- 1955 Clara Zetkin Medal
- 1955 Patriotic Order of Merit in silver
- 1959 Banner of Labor
- 1960 Banner of Labor
- 1965 Patriotic Order of Merit in gold
- 1969 Patriotic Order of Merit in honor clasp

In 1989 the East German postal service featured Edith Baumann on a postage stampStamps of Germany (DDR) 1989, MiNr 3222.jpg.
