= Albert Schreiner =

German communist activist and historian

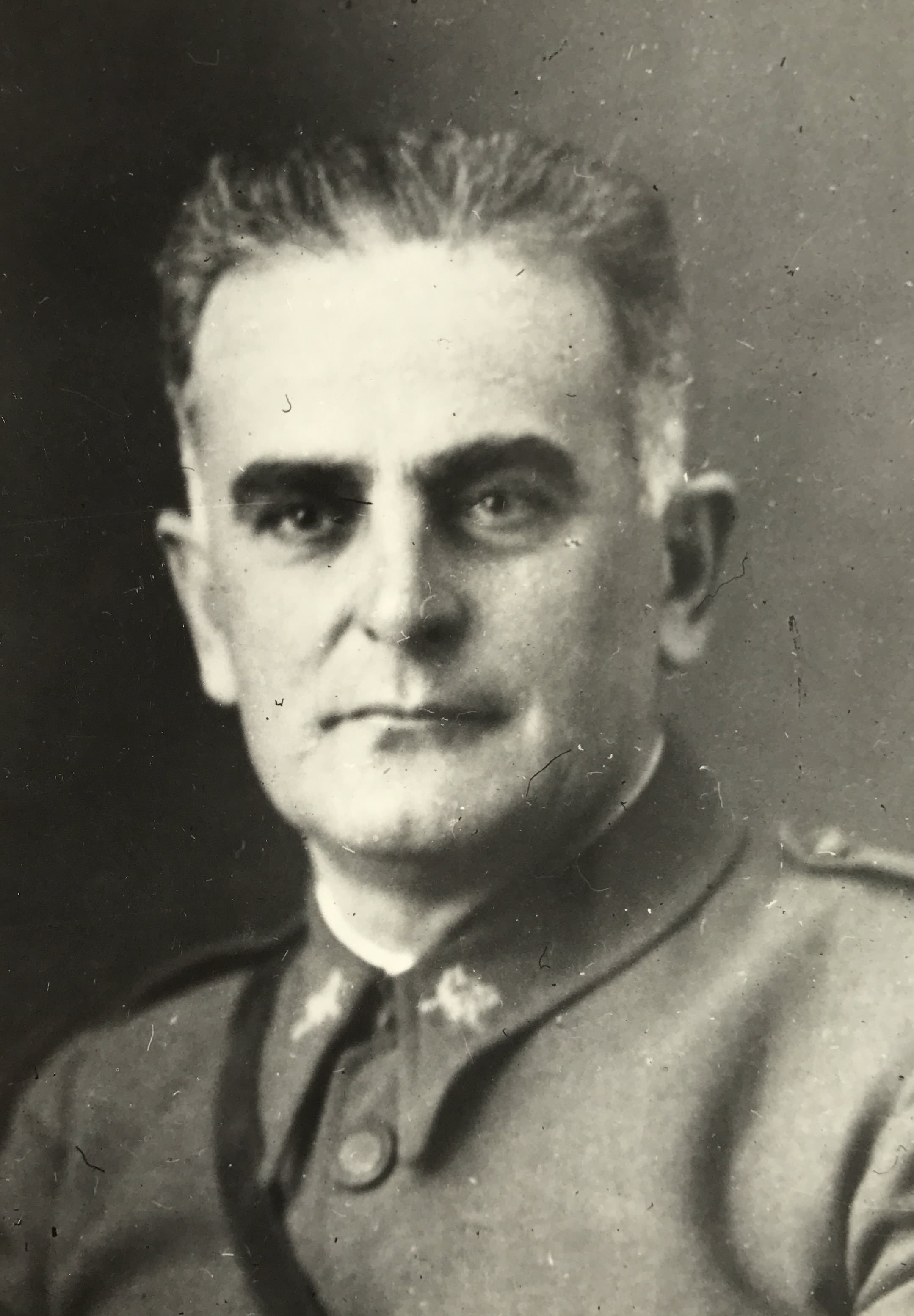
- Schreiner in Spain c. 1936–1939

Minister of War of the Free People's State of Württemberg
- In office 11 November 1918 – 15 November 1918
- Minister-President: Wilhelm Blos
- Preceded by: Otto von Marchtaler
- Succeeded by: Ulrich Fischer

Personal details
- Born: 7 August 1892 Aglasterhausen, Grand Duchy of Baden, German Empire
- Died: 4 August 1979 (aged 86) East Berlin, East Germany
- Party: SPD (1910–1917); USPD (1917–1919); KPD (1919–1929, 1933–1946); KPD(O) (1929–1933); SED (after 1946)
- Other political affiliations: Spartacus League (1914–1918)
- Occupation: Locksmith; Mechanic; Politician; Revolutionary; Author; Historian

Military service
- Allegiance: Revolutionaries; Spanish Republic
- Branch/service: Antimilitärischer Apparat; International Brigades
- Years of service: 1923; 1936–1939
- Rank: Brigade Chief of Staff
- Unit: XIII International Brigade
- Battles/wars: Hamburg Uprising; Spanish Civil War

Albert Hermann Schreiner (7 August 1892 – 4 August 1979) was a German communist revolutionary, politician, and historian. He served briefly as minister of war of the Free People's State of Württemberg following the German Revolution, then in the Antimilitärischer Apparat of the Communist Party of Germany during the Hamburg Uprising, and finally as chief of staff for the XIII International Brigade during the Spanish Civil War.

== Life ==
The son of a metalworker and SPD functionary, he became an SPD member in 1910, where he belonged to the party's left wing. In the First World War he was in the Spartacus League and subsequently was a founding member of the KPD. He played a significant role at Stuttgart during the November Revolution. On 9 November 1918 he became Minister of War for the first revolutionary government of the Free People's State of Württemberg. Since the Spartacus League in Stuttgart under the leadership of Fritz Rück and August Thalheimer refused to take part in the government, Schreiner withdrew from the Blos Cabinet on 15 November.

Until 1922 he was a paid functionary of the KPD in Württemberg. At the Fourth World Congress of Komintern he participated as a delegate. In 1923 he worked in the military wing of the KPD and was then M-Leader of the Wasserkante (Hamburg-Schleswig-Holstein) district during the Hamburg Uprising. In 1924 he attended the military school in Moscow; in the same year he co-founded Roter Frontkämpferbund (RFB), becoming one of its leaders and editor-in-chief of its newspaper, the Rote Front. In 1927 he was dispatched to the 11th party congress of the KPD in Essen.

In the corruption scandal concerning Willy Leow (second chairman of the RFB), Schreiner took a critical position. Nicknamed the KPD-"Rechter" ("right wing"), he lost all functions in the RFB and was expelled from the KPD in 1929. He joined the Communist Party of Germany (Opposition) (KPO) of Heinrich Brandler and August Thalheimer and worked at Gegen den Strom (Against the Flow), the theoretical newspaper of the KPO. He was also a member of the Berlin district leadership and the national leadership of the organisation. In October 1932 Schreiner unexpectedly quit the KPO and then rejoined after criticism from his local group. Brandler opposed his return.

In 1933 Schreiner emigrated to France and became a KPD member again. He was secretary of the Thälmann Committee and chief of staff of the XIII International Brigade during the Spanish Civil War. After their defeat in 1939, he fled to Morocco, where he was imprisoned. In 1941, on the way to Mexico, he was detained in the United States, where he remained until 1946. As in France, he wrote military and historical fiction. He was a founding member of the "German American Emergency Conference" in 1942 and of the "Council for a Democratic Germany" (CDG) in 1944.

At the end of 1946 he returned to Germany and enrolled in the recently formed SED. In 1947 he was appointed Professor of the University of Leipzig, where he was subsequently Dean of Social Sciences. Schreiner published various books. From 1950 he was Head of Department at the Marx-Engels-Lenin-Institute of the SED Central Committee. From 1950 to 1953 there was an SED campaign against former KPO members, implemented by the Central Party Control Commission. On account of his former membership, Schreiner was briefly proscribed. In 1952 he became head of the "1918–1945" department at the Museum for German History and in 1956 he became head of the "1918–1945" department at the Historical Institute of the German Academy of Sciences at Berlin. He retired in 1960.

Schreiner was awarded the National Prize of East Germany in 1952, the Order of Karl Marx in 1962, the Patriotic Order of Merit in 1967, the Patriotic Order of Merit with golden honour clasp in 1972 and the Star of People's Friendship in 1977.

Schreiner and a small group of like-minded individuals sought to establish historical seminars and institutes in the DDR which conformed to the SED's regulations. The "Guild" of DDR Historians was not initially in the Marxist tradition. According to Lothar Mertens, Schreiner (like Horst Bartel, Walter Bartel, Karl Bittel, and Rudolf Lindau) lacked the necessary skill and rigour to sufficiently distance his academic output from the category of "mere" party propaganda. In contrast, Hermann Weber asserts that Schreiner "repeatedly clashed with the SED's official line."

== Writings ==
22 publications, including

- Die deutsche Sozialdemokratie. Vierzehn Jahre im Bunde mit dem Kapital, Berlin, 1928 (with Paul Frölich)
- Hitler treibt zum Krieg, 1934, co-author, edited by Dorothy Woodman
- Hitlers Luftflotte startbereit!, 1935 edited by Dorothy Woodman
- Hitlers motorisierte Stoßarmee, 1936 under the pseudonym Albert Müller
- Vom totalen Krieg zur totalen Niederlage Hitlers A critique of the military ideology of the Third Reich. Paris 1939
- The Lesson of Germany. A Guide to her History. New York 1945 (with Albert Norden and Gerhart Eisler)
- Zur Geschichte der deutschen Aussenpolitik, 1871–1945. Bd 1. 1871–1918. Von der Reichseinigung bis zur Novemberrevolution. Berlin 1952
- Revolutionäre Ereignisse und Probleme in Deutschland während der Periode der Grossen Sozialistischen Oktoberrevolution 1917/1918. Beiträge zum 40. Jahrestag der Grossen Sozialistischen Oktoberrevolution. Berlin 1957

== Bibliography ==
- Theodor Bergmann. Gegen den Strom. Die Geschichte der KPD(-Opposition). Hamburg 2004.
- Pierre Broué et al. Revolution in Allemagne (1917–1923). Paris 1971.
- Mario Keßler. "Hitler treibt zum Krieg. Albert Schreiner als Militärwissenschaftler im Exil." Jahrbuch für Forschungen zur Geschichte der Arbeiterbewegung. Part. II/2008.
- Till Kössler (2007). "Schreiner, Albert Hermann". Neue Deutsche Biographie (in German). Vol. 23. Berlin: Duncker & Humblot. pp. 537–538. (full text online).
- Ilko-Sascha Kowalczuk: "Schreiner, Albert." In Wer war wer in der DDR? 5th edition. Vol. 2, Berlin 2010, ISBN 978-3-86153-561-4.
- Karl Hermann Tjaden: Struktur und Funktion der „KPD-Opposition“ (KPO). Meisenheim am Glan 1964.
- Hermann Weber: Die Wandlung des deutschen Kommunismus. Die Stalinisierung der KPD in der Weimarer Republik. Frankfurt am Main 1969, pp. 289 f.
