= Wolfgang Schröder =

German historian (1935-2010)

- Born: 9 July 1935; Dresden, German Reich
- Died: 18 November 2010 (aged 75); Taucha, Germany
- Occupation: Educator
- Spouse: Renate Dreßler-Schröder

Academic background
- Education: Karl Marx University; German Academy of Sciences and Humanities
- Doctoral advisor: Ernst Engelberg; Lothar Mosler

Academic work
- Discipline: Historian
- Sub-discipline: German labour movement historian
- Institutions: German Academy of Sciences and Humanities

Wolfgang Schröder (9 July 1935 - 18 November 2010) was a German historian. The early decades of his professional career were spent as a member of the East German historical establishment: the focus of much of his work was on the history of the labour movement. He nevertheless remained professionally active and made further important contributions through his published work and teaching during the years after reunification.

== Life ==
Wolfgang Schröder was born in Dresden in 1935.

He passed his school final exams (Abitur) in 1953. He studied history at the Karl Marx University 1953 and 1957. After which he worked as a secondary school teacher.

In 1958 he became a research assistant at the "1871–1917 department" at the Leipzig branch of the Institute for History of the German Academy of Sciences and Humanities. He received his doctorate in July 1963, supervised by Ernst Engelberg and Lothar Mosler. His subject was the German Trades Union movement in the 1890s. A peculiar feature of the East German university system - taking a lead from the Soviet system - was the Promotion B (loosely "Doctorate B"), which in terms of building an academic career (though not, protagonists insist, in other respects) took the place of a Habilitation qualification. Schröder received his Promotion B in 1972 for work on the Labour Movement in the final third of the nineteenth century.

Between 1969 and 1990 he was employed as editor responsible for the Jahrbuch für Geschichte ([East German] History Yearbook). From 1973 he was also a member of its editorial college. In 1976 he relocated from Leipzig to East Berlin when he switched to working as a researcher at the Central/National Historical Institute at the German Academy of Sciences and Humanities. It was here, in 1986, that he received the title of "professor".

Following the changes of 1989/1990, from 1992 till 1996 Schröder worked as an assistant at the Bonn-based Commission for the history of parliamentarianism and political parties [in Germany].

Schröder's main research area was the history of the later nineteenth century, with a particular focus on the German labour movement. After publishing a book on Ernestine Liebknecht (1897, 2nd ed., 1989) and an essay on Nathalie Liebknecht (1990), his crowning academic achievement was to have been his biography of Wilhelm Liebknecht (1826-1900), a pioneer of the SPD, and the father of Karl Liebknecht (1871 - 1919). Unfortunately, when Wolfgang Schröder died at Taucha in 2010, the biography remained unfinished. However, the project was well progressed, and three years later his widow, Renate Dreßler-Schröder and the historian Klaus Kinner were able to publish a version of it in 2013 as part of Schröder's literary legacy. No attempt was made to gloss over the fragmentary nature of the work, but it nevertheless contained a large amount of new research involving hitherto overlooked sources.

== Output (selection) ==
- Klassenkämpfe und Gewerkschaftseinheit. Tribüne, Berlin 1965.
- Liebknecht, Wilhelm. In: Karl Obermann and others (compiler/editor): Biographisches Lerxikon zur Deutschen Geschichte. Von den Anfängen bis 1917. Deutscher Verlag der Wissenschaften. Berlin 1967, p. 287–289.
- Liebknecht, Wilhelm Philipp Martin Christian. In: Geschichte der deutschen Arbeiterbewegung. Biographisches Lexikon. Dietz Verlag, Berlin 1970, p. 293–298.
- Partei und Gewerkschaften. Die Gewerkschaftsbewegung in der Konzeption der revolutionären Sozialdemokratie 1868/69 bis 1893. Tribüne, Berlin 1975.
- Horst Bartel, Wolfgang Schröder, Gustav Seeber, Heinz Wolter: Der Sozialdemokrat 1879 – 1890. Ein Beitrag zur Rolle des Zentralorgans im Kampf der revolutionären Arbeiterbewegung gegen das Sozialistengesetz. Dietz Verlag, Berlin 1975.
- Hrsg.: Wilhelm Liebknecht . Kleine politische Schriften. Reclam, Leipzig 1976. (Lizenzausgabe Röderberg Verlag, Frankfurt am Main ISBN 3-8768-2418-4)
- Hans Hugo von Kleist-Retzow. Ein Junker von Schrot und Korn. In: Gustav Seeber (Editor-compiler): Gestalten der Bismarckzeit. Band 1. Akademie Verlag, Berlin 1978, pp. 218–242.
- Wilhelm Liebknecht. Vorkämpfer der Revolution von unten. In: Gustav Seeber (Editor-compiler): Gestalten der Bismarckzeit. Vol 1. Akademie Verlag, Berlin 1978, pp. 79–105.
- Horst Bartel, Wolfgang Schröder, Gustav Seeber: Das Sozialistengesetz 1878 1890. Illustrierte Geschichte des Kampfes der Arbeiterklasse gegen das Ausnahmegesetz. Dietz Verlag, Berlin 1980.
- mit Gerhard Keiderling und Ingo Materna (editor-compilers): Studien zur Geschichte Berlins. Akademie-Verlag, Berlin 1987, ISBN 3-05-000286-7.
- Ernestine. Vom ungewöhnlichen Leben der ersten Frau Wilhelm Liebknechts; eine dokumentarische Erzählung. Verlag für die Frau, Leipzig 1987, ISBN 3-7304-0085-1.
- „Sie können sich denken, wie mir oft zu Muthe war …“ Jenny Marx in Briefen an eine vertraute Freundin. Verlag für die Frau, Leipzig 1989, ISBN 3-7304-0233-1
- Ich muß mich ganz hingeben können. Anspruch, Ernüchterung und Bekenntnis Nathalie Liebknechts. In: Friderun Bodeit (editor-compiler): Ich muß mich ganz hingeben können. Frauen in Leipzig. Verlag für die Frau, Leipzig 1990, pp. 137–156 und 236–237.
- Wilhelm Liebknechts Vorstoß ins Neuland. In: Alternativen denken. Kritisch emanzipatorische Gesellschaftstheorien als Reflex auf die soziale Frage in der bürgerlichen Gesellschaft. Herausgegeben vom Zentralinstitut für Philosophie. Zentralinstitut für Philosophie, Berlin 1991, pp. 75–79. (Kolloquium zum Thema: Alternativen Denken, 4. und 5. Oktober 1991, Berlin).
- Wilhelm Liebknecht und Friedrich Ludwig Weidig. Personelle Marginalien zum Verhältnis von Demokratie und Sozialismus. Sonderdruck aus: Bürgerliche Revolution und revolutionäre Linke. Beiträge eines wissenschaftlichen Kolloquiums anläßlich des 70. Geburtstages von Helmut Bock. Produced by Walter Schmidt, Berlin 2000, S. 143–150.
- mit Elvira Döscher: Sächsische Parlamentarier 1869–1918. Die Abgeordneten der II. Kammer des Königreichs Sachsen im Spiegel historischer Photographien; ein biographisches Handbuch. Droste, Düsseldorf 2001, ISBN 3-7700-5236-6.
- Landtagswahlen im Königreich Sachsen 1869–1895/1896. Verlag der Sächsischen Akademie der Wissenschaften, Leipzig 2002–2004, ISBN 3-89679-189-3.
- „Ein Hauptkerl, auf den sie sich verlassen können“. Wie August Bebel und Wilhelm Liebknecht anno 1881 ihren Asylort Borsdorf „entdeckten“. In: Kein Nachruf! Beiträge über und für Götz Langkau. IISG, Amsterdam 2003, pp. 81–88.
- Leipzig – die Wiege der deutschen Arbeiterbewegung. Wurzeln und Werden des Arbeiterbildungsvereins 1848/49 – 1878/81. Mit einer Dokumentation der Tätigkeitsberichte. Karl Dietz, Berlin 2010, ISBN 978-3-320-02214-3.
- Wilhelm Liebknecht. Soldat der Revolution, Parteiführer, Parlamentarier. Ein Fragment. Karl Dietz, Berlin 2013, ISBN 3-320-02289-X. (Bibliografie, pp. 461–476.)
