= Karl Bittel =

German historian and journalist

- Born: 22 June 1892; Darmstadt, Germany
- Died: 18 April 1969 (aged 76); Berlin, East Germany
- Education: Heidelberg; Freiburg; Tübingen
- Occupations: Historian; Journalist
- Political party: KPD
- Spouse: Hermine 1890-1968
- Children: Viktor; Karl; Hans-Peter
- Parent(s): Peter Bittel; Clara Anna Koch/Bittel

Karl Bittel (22 June 1892 – 18 April 1969) was a German left-wing historian and journalist.

== Life ==
Karl Bittel was born in Darmstadt. His father was a bank worker. He attended school at Freiburg in the south-west of Germany, across the Rhine from Mulhouse. He passed his school final exams in 1911. By that time he had already co-founded a Freiburg Wandervogel youth group, for which he produced a news-sheet. Then, between 1911 and 1915, he studied Economics (Volkswirtschaft), Law and History at the universities of Heidelberg, Freiburg and Tübingen. It was while he was at Tübingen that he joined the Deutsche Akademische Freischar, a (relatively) forward looking student fraternity. He received his doctorate from Tübingen in 1915 for a dissertation on the consumer-co-operative movement pioneer, Eduard Pfeiffer.

Bittel was a volunteer contributor to the "Freiburger Volksstimme", a local newspaper at the popular end of the political spectrum, and served between 1913 and 1916 as Secretary for Consumers Club in nearby Esslingen. At the same time he was publishing articles on the Co-Operative movement. In August 1914 war had broken out, and it ended in November 1918 with military defeat for Germany and her allies. During the revolutionary year that ensued in Germany Bittel was a member of the Soldiers' and Workers' Council in Karlsruhe. In 1919 Bittel became a member of the newly established German Communist Party.

He became a lecturer at the Party Main Academy in Jena in 1920, and then editor of a Chemnitz based newspaper called "Kämpfer" ("Fighters"). This was just one of a succession of radical left-wing journals which he produced or for which he was writing during this time. The early 1920s saw a splintering on the political left in Germany, triggered in part by contrasting reactions to the fast moving political events in the Soviet Union, but Bittel remained true to the mainstream Communist Party through the period, becoming head of the Party Central Committee's "Co-operatives Department" in 1922. 1922 was also the year in which he became, in November, a Communist Party member of the town council in Weißenfels.

Published output (not a complete list)
- Eduard Pfeiffer und die deutsche Konsumgenossenschaftsbewegung, Schriften des Vereins für Socialpolitik, Bd. 151/1, München und Leipzig 1915
- Die Geschichte des Konsum- und Sparvereins Eßlingen am Neckar. Zum fünfzigjährigen Bestehen 1865 - 1915, Esslingen 1915
- as compiler and editor: Genossenschaftliche Kultur. Eine Flugschriftensammlung der Gesellschaft für genossenschaftliche Kultur, Wilhelm Langguth, Esslingen 1915-1916
- as compiler and editor: Der Freistaat. Freideutsche Flugschriften zum Sozialismus, Karlsruhe 1918
- as compiler and editor: Politische Rundbriefe, Esslingen 1918-1921
- as compiler and editor: Süddeutsche Arbeiter-Zeitung, Fortsetzung der politischen Rundbriefe, Verlag Dr. Karl Bittel, Esslingen, erste Nummer vom 31. Oktober 1921
- as compiler and editor: Der kommunistische Genossenschaftler, 1919-1924
- as compiler and editor: Die Genossenschaft im Klassenkampf, 1924
- as editor.: DEROP-Blätter, Hauszeitschrift der Deutschen Vertriebsgesellschaft für Russische Öl-Produkte, Berlin 1931/32
- Sernatinger Chronik, Karlsruhe 1939
- Der berühmte Herr Doctor Mesmer 1734-1815, Friedrichshafen 1940
- Rudolf Tischner, Karl Bittel: Mesmer und sein Problem. Magnetismus, Suggestion, Hypnose, Hippokrates Verlag, Stuttgart 1941
- Wilhelm Wolff: Der Aufruhr der Weber in Schlesien (Juni 1844) und andere Schriften. Mit einer Einleitung von Karl Bittel, (Schriftenreihe für journalistische Schulung. Hrsg. vom Verband der Deutschen Presse), Berlin 1952 (2. erw. Aufl. 1952)
- Die Feinde der deutschen Nation. Eine historische Dokumentation über die Deutschlandpolitik der imperialistischen Westmächte von 1942 - 1949, Berlin 1952 (fünf Auflagen bis 1955)
- Karl Marx als Journalist, Aufbau Verlag, Berlin 1953
- Paracelsus und seine Vaterstadt Villach, Klagenfurt 1953
- Arbeit und Aufgaben des Deutschen Instituts für Zeitgeschichte in Berlin. In: Zeitschrift für Geschichtswissenschaft 4 (1956), S. 1253-1255
- as editor: Der Kommunistenprozeß zu Köln 1852 im Spiegel der zeitgenössischen Presse, Rütten & Loening, Berlin 1955
- Der Landbote von Georg Büchner. In: Neue deutsche Presse, 9. Jg. 1955, Nr.9, S.4-8.
- Zeitgeschichte als Wissenschaft, Berlin 1956
- Ein deutscher Staatenbund (Konföderation), Berlin 1957
- Atomwaffenfreie Zone in Europa, Berlin 1958
- Spaltung und Wiedervereinigung Deutschlands, in two volumes, Berlin 1958 und 1959
- Alliierter Kontrollrat und Außenministerkonferenzen. Aus der Praxis der Deutschlandpolitik der vier Mächte seit 1945, Berlin 1959
- Der Warschauer Vertrag über Freundschaft, Zusammenarbeit und gegenseitigen Beistand, Berlin 1960
- Der Revanchismus als Kriegsvorbereitung in der Bonner Bundesrepublik, Berlin 1961
- Wir klagen an!: die Wahrheit über die faschistischen Konzentrationslager im Ostseegebiet; eine kurze Führung durch die Ausstellung anlässlich der Ostseewoche vom 10.7.-13.8.1966 im Haus der Nationalen Volksarmee, Stralsund, Ahrenshoop 1966

In 1923 he was a delegate to the Comintern's First World Congress of Farmers' organisation (identified in some sources as "Krestintern"). Bittel then remained in the Soviet Union, till 1927 working as Secretary to the Comintern's Co-Operative section. In August 1927 he returned to Germany. In 1928 he took charge of the administration office for Soviet trade representation, and then, from 1930 till (formally) April 1933 at the Berlin-based successor Soviet-German organisation known as DEROP AG. Régime change came to Germany in January 1933 and the new Chancellor lost little time in moving the country towards one-party dictatorship. Membership of alternative political parties became illegal, with the Communists a particular target for state persecution. During the early months of 1933 Karl Bittel left Berlin and settled in Bodman-Ludwigshafen. It was in his new home in a village on the shores of the Bodensee that Bittel was arrested by the Gestapo in May 1933. He spent the next year or so in detention in concentration camps at Heuberg and then just outside Ulm.

He was released in 1934. Unlike many Communists, he was able to remain in Germany during the twelve years of Nazi rule, but there is no evidence of his having engaged in any sort of political activity during this time. He was able to live unmolested in his remote lake-side village, focusing on academic research. He was even able to have some of his work published: a work involving Paracelsus was printed in 1942.

In May 1945 war ended. What remained of Germany was divided up into four occupation zones, in which membership of the Communist Party was no longer illegal. Bittel now joined the Party Secretariat and the party's regional leadership team for Baden, where he also became Chairman of the Baden branch of the Union of Persecutees of the Nazi Regime, a post he held till Summer 1949. In addition, in 1946 he co-founded a Communist Newspaper based in Offenburg, entitled "Unser Tag" ("Our Day"), becoming "licence holder" and editor in chief of the publication till 1948.

By 1949 it had become clear that whatever the future might hold for Germany, the portion of it under Soviet administration was developing very differently from the zones occupied by the other three victorious wartime powers. As the Soviet blockade of West Berlin was lifted, in May 1949 the US, British and American zones were combined and re-founded as the German Federal Republic. Bittel's prompt reaction was to relocate the same month from what was now designated West Germany, to the Soviet occupation zone, which itself would be re-founded a few months later, in October, as the Soviet sponsored German Democratic Republic. Between 1949 and 1957 Bittel served as deputy head, and then from 1951 as head of the German Institute for Contemporary History (Deutsches Institut für Zeitgeschichte").

From 1951 till 1953 he also held office as the Senior Chairman of the (East) German Union of Journalists. He was made an honorary professor at the "Karl Marx University" (as it was then known) in Leipzig, and in 1957 became a full professor, with a teaching position, at the Humboldt University of Berlin. That year he was also invited to present a series of guest lectures in the Soviet Union. In 1958 his job portfolio was boosted with a special advisory post to the East German Ministry for Foreign Affairs. Between 1963 and 1969 he also belonged to the Presidium of the Rostock branch of the national Culture Association.

Bittel was one of a small but determined group of like-minded historians who promoted the orienting of historical seminars and institutions according to the precepts of East Germany's ruling Socialist Unity Party (SED / Sozialistische Einheitspartei Deutschlands). This was seen as necessary because, especially in the early years of the German Democratic Republic, the country's mainstream historians were drawn, for the most part, from outside the Marxist historical tradition. Nevertheless, in the judgement of Lothar Mertens, Karl Bittel - along with colleagues such as Horst Bartel, Walter Bartel, Rudolf Lindau and Albert Schreiner - lacked the necessary skill and rigour sufficiently to distance their academic output from the category of "mere" party propaganda.

== Awards and honours ==
- 1954: Patriotic Order of Merit in silver
- 1958: Medal for Fighters Against Fascism
- 1962: Order of Karl Marx
- Fritz-Heckert-Medaille
- Franz-Mehring-Ehrennadel
