= Kurt Tiedke =

German politician (1924–1976)

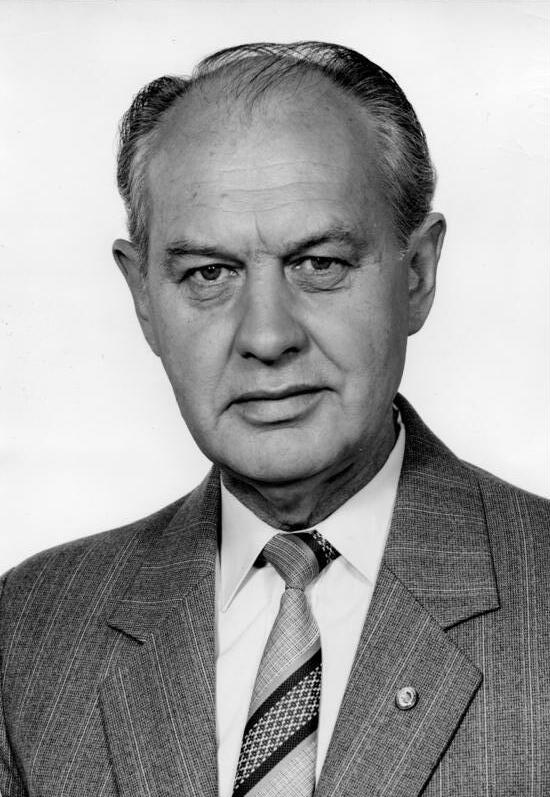
- Tiedke in 1982

Principal of the "Karl Marx" Party Academy
- In office 23 June 1983 – 14 November 1989
- First Deputy: Karl Hartmann
- Preceded by: Hanna Wolf
- Succeeded by: Götz Dieckmann

First Secretary of the Socialist Unity Party in Bezirk Magdeburg
- In office 11 February 1979 – 22 June 1983
- Second Secretary: Walter Kirnich
- Preceded by: Alois Pisnik
- Succeeded by: Werner Eberlein
Volkskammer
Member of the Volkskammer for Haldensleben, Oschersleben, Wolmirstedt, Wanzleben (Genthin, Havelberg, Stendal, Tangerhütte; 1981–1986)
In office 25 June 1981 – 5 April 1990
Preceded by	Gerhard Kupke
Succeeded by	Constituency abolished

Personal details
- Born: Kurt Hermann Tiedke; 30 May 1924 Krebsfelde, Free City of Danzig (now Rakowiska, Poland)
- Died: 15 April 2015 (aged 90)
- Party: Party of Democratic Socialism (1989–1990)
- Other political affiliations: Socialist Unity Party (1948–1989)
- Education: "Karl Marx" Party Academy; CPSU Higher Party School "W. I. Lenin" (Dipl.-Ges.-Wiss.)
- Occupation: Politician; Party Functionary; Academic
- Awards: Patriotic Order of Merit, 1st class; Order of Karl Marx
- Central institution membership: 1967–1989: Full member, Central Committee; 1963–1967: Candidate member, Central Committee; Other offices held: 1979–1983: Member, National Defence Council; 1961–1979: Head, Propaganda Department of the Central Committee; 1949–1950: Second Secretary, Socialist Unity Party in Seelow district

Kurt Hermann Tiedke (30 May 1924 – 15 April 2015) was a German politician and party functionary of the Socialist Unity Party (SED).

A teacher at the SED's "Karl Marx" Party Academy in the 1950s, he was the longtime head of the Propaganda Department of the Central Committee of the SED before briefly serving as First Secretary of the Bezirk Magdeburg SED, also becoming a member of the National Defense Council of the GDR.

He returned to the party academy in 1983 as principal upon the retirement of Hanna Wolf. Until his ouster during the Peaceful Revolution, Tiedke steadfastly held onto the SED's hardline stance.

== Life and career ==
=== Early career ===
Tiedke was born as the son of a carpenter and, like the majority of boys, was a member of the Hitler Youth, reaching the rank of Oberrottenführer. He subsequently began an apprenticeship as surveyor in Tiegenhof. At the age of 18, he was conscripted into the Reich Labor Service and later into the Wehrmacht.

While in Soviet captivity, he attended an anti-fascist school and, after returning to Germany in 1948, joined the ruling Socialist Unity Party (SED). He began a party career in the State of Brandenburg, serving as instructor, cadre department head and finally Second Secretary of the Seelow district SED.

From 1950 to 1951, he was a student and then, until 1960, a teacher at the "Karl Marx" Party Academy (German: Parteihochschule „Karl Marx“) (PHS). After graduating from the CPSU Higher Party School "W. I. Lenin" in Moscow in 1957, he was made head of the PHS' CPSU and International Workers' Movement Department.

=== SED Central Committee ===
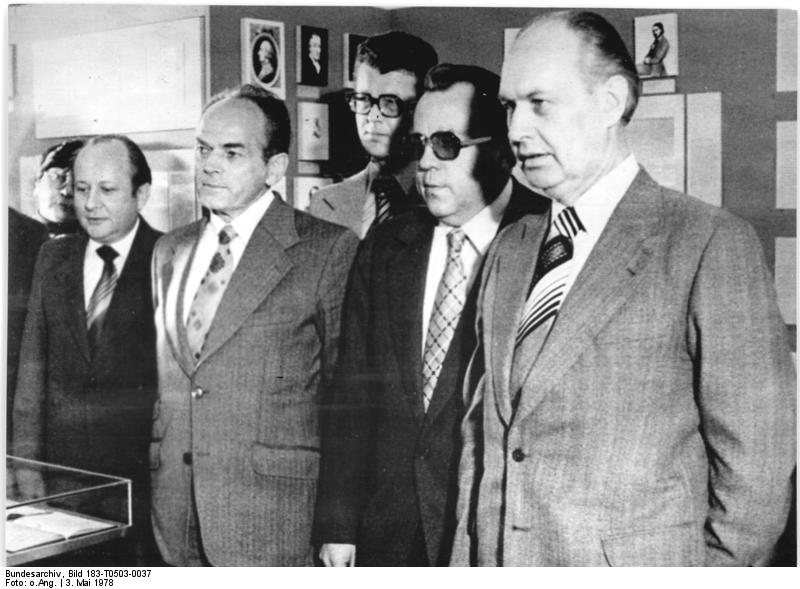
Tiedke (right) visiting the Karl Marx House in Trier in May 1978

Afterward, he held various senior positions in the apparatus of the Central Committee of the SED. He was initially made deputy head of the Propaganda and Agitation Department in 1961. When the Department was split up later that year, he became head of the separated Propaganda Department.

Starting in January 1963 (VI. Party Congress), he was a candidate member, and from April 1967 (VII. Party Congress) to its collective resignation in December 1989, a full member of the Central Committee of the SED.

=== Bezirk Magdeburg SED First Secretary ===
In February 1979, Tiedke was elected to the position of the First Secretary of the Bezirk Magdeburg SED, succeeding longtime incumbent Alois Pisnik.

Pisnik officially retired for health reasons, but in reality was removed on the instigation of SED General Secretary Erich Honecker and his economic czar Günter Mittag for his repeated criticism of central economic management, especially supply shortages in and undue planning expectations for his Bezirk. Tiedke did not have much of a connection to the Bezirk, but was regarded as loyal.

Tiedke additionally became member of the National Defense Council of the GDR later that year, likely due to the long western border of Bezirk Magdeburg with West Germany, and of the Volkskammer in 1981, nominally representing rural constituencies in his Bezirk, first in the northeast, then in the southwest.

Tiedke was awarded the Patriotic Order of Merit in silver in 1964, in gold in 1974 and the Order of Karl Marx in 1984.

=== Party Academy Principal ===
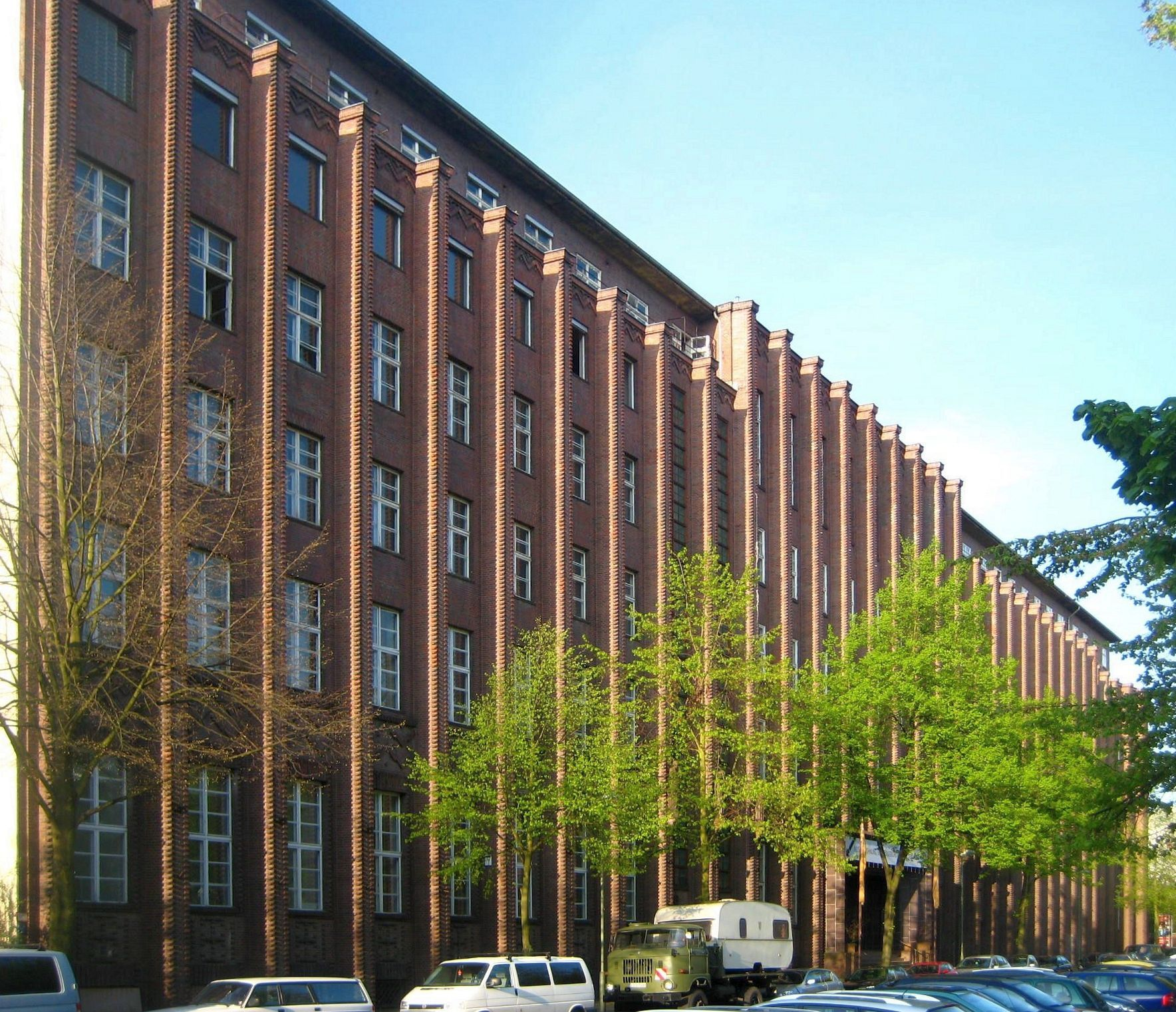
Haus am Köllnischen Park, the former "Karl Marx" Party Academy building, nicknamed "Red Monastery", in April 2010

In June 1983, he returned to the "Karl Marx" Party Academy, succeeding retiring hardliner Hanna Wolf as principal.

Though Tiedke represented a generational shift at the leadership of the PHS, he did not introduce ideological changes, adhering strictly to the Marxist–Leninist doctrine. Tiedke did introduce university-style seminars, which he pretended to have invented, calling it the triumph of "modern socialist pedagogy".

Mikhail Gorbachev's election as head of the Communist Party of the Soviet Union (CPSU) and his reform program perestroika and glasnost challenged the SED and the PHS. After ignoring them, party leadership claimed there was no need for any changes in the GDR. As Honecker and Gorbachev increasingly drifted apart in the later half of the 1980s, the PHS loyally supported the hardliners. In his reports to chief party ideologue Kurt Hager, Tiedke claimed that visiting Soviet functionaries were praising the SED and criticizing Gorbachev's reform program.

=== Peaceful Revolution ===
During the Peaceful Revolution, the PHS was set to develop an ideological offensive. In May 1989 Hanna Wolf and Wolfgang Schneider published a lengthy article in the party newspaper Neues Deutschland, defending Stalin and attacking glasnost.

On 14 November 1989, he was removed from the position of principal. Prorector Götz Dieckmann was installed as his successor, who led the party academy until its dissolution in June 1990.

He was expelled from the SED's successor party, the Party of Democratic Socialism (PDS), in March 1990, after which he operated in the milieu of the German Communist Party (DKP) and its press.

=== Death ===
Tiedke died in 2015 at the age of 90.

His two sons held positions in journalism during and after the GDR period.
