= Rudolf Lindau (politician) =

German politician and historian (1888–1977)

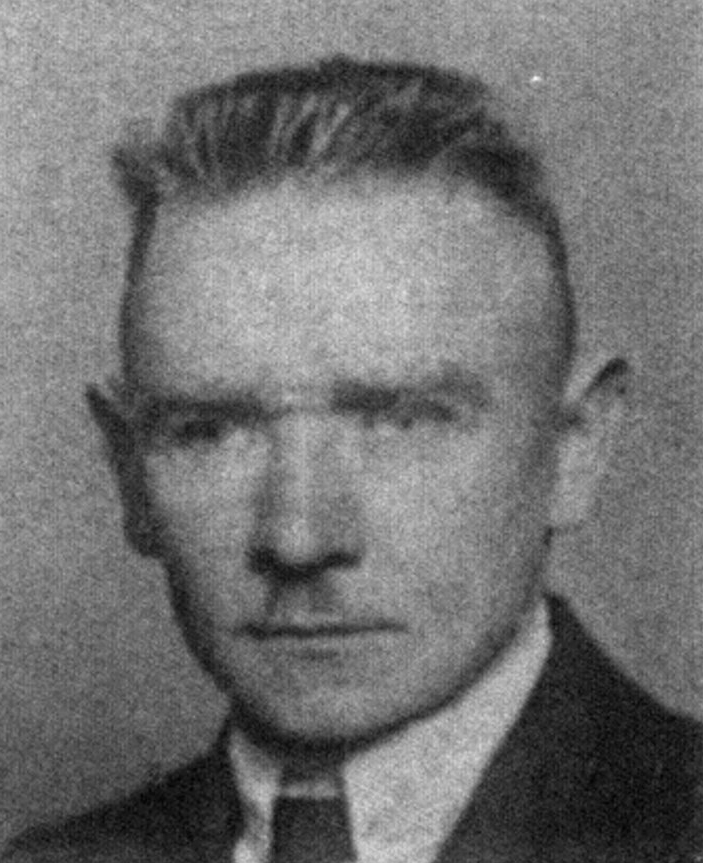
- Lindau c. 1924
- Born: 28 March 1888; Riddagshausen, Duchy of Brunswick, German Empire
- Died: 18 October 1977 (aged 89); East Berlin, East Germany
- Occupations: Politician; Writer
- Political party: SPD; KPD; SED

Paul Rudolf Lindau (28 March 1888 – 18 October 1977) was a German politician and historian. Between 1946 and 1950 he served as the first director of the newly established "Karl Marx" Party Academy in the Soviet occupation zone (after 1949 the German Democratic Republic).

Sources may also refer to him under one of the pseudonyms under which he operated and wrote in the 1930s, Paul Graetz / Rudolf Grätz.

== Life ==
Rudolf Lindau was born in Riddagshausen, a small village which was at that time a short distance outside and to the east of Braunschweig in northern Germany. His father was a saddler. Rudolf Lindau's first job was in a bakery after which he took work in a foundry, before he moved into the transport sector, first joining a trades union in 1904. At around this time he relocated to Hamburg. In 1906 or 1907 he joined the Social Democratic Party (SPD). Politically, he was positioned on the left wing of the party, providing secretarial support to the academic Heinrich Laufenberg's with the latter's creation of the "History of the Workers' Movement in Hamburg, Altona and the surrounding region" ("Geschichte der Arbeiterbewegung in Hamburg, Altona und Umgegend"). From 1911 he was employed as a junior editor by the "Hamburger Echo", an SPD supporting newspaper.

War broke out in August 1914 and Lindau found himself aligned with the so-called Bremen radical leftists, attending the January 1916 Spartacus League conference as a delegate from the Bremen group. Between September 1916 and November 1918, when the war formally ended in defeat and, for Germany, revolution and a republic, Lindau was a soldier in the army.

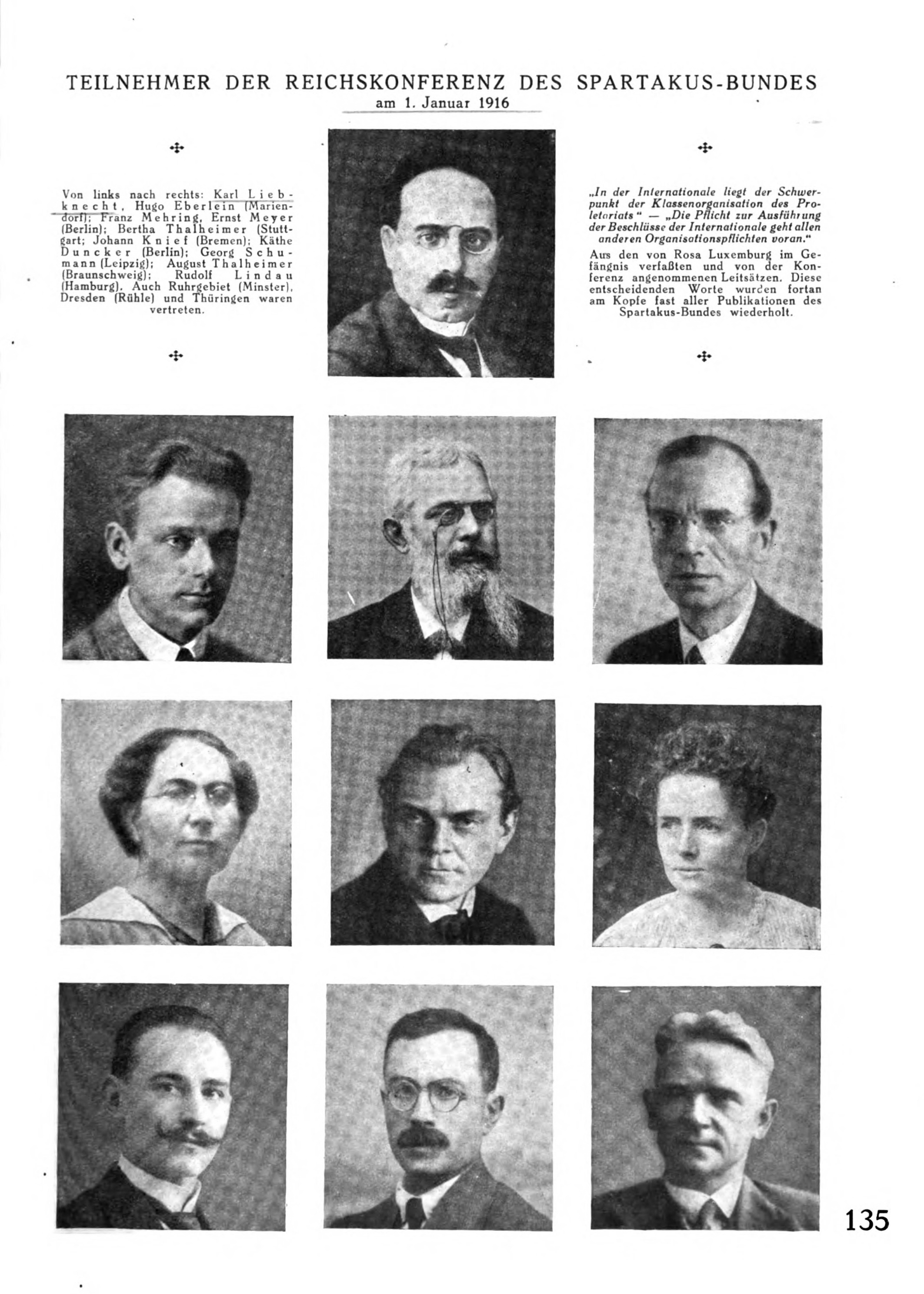
Lindau (bottom row, right) among participants of the Reich Conference of the Spartacus League, 1 January 1916

During the war there was a splintering of SPD support in Germany, chiefly over the issue of the party leadership's support for the war. At the end of 1918 the Communist Party was formed from the socialist and pacifist strands that had broken away, and Lindau became a leading Communist Party official from the outset, at a regional level in Hamburg and Saxony and also at a national level. He also became a leading editor of the party's press apparatus, involved with titles such as the Kommunistische Arbeiterzeitung, the Kommunistische Pressekorrespondenz and the Bergische Arbeiterstimme. Between 1921 and 1924, and again in 1927/28 he was a member of the Hamburg Parliament during a politically turbulent decade in the city. In May 1924 Lindau also became, till December 1924, a member of the National Legislature (Reichstag), taking the place of Wilhelm Deisen when the latter was forced to withdraw his name from the party list on finding himself on the losing side in a split within the Communist Party. Rudolf Lindau's own political convictions continued to draw him towards the left wing of the party, but through the period of fragmentation that was a feature of the German Communist Party during the 1920s he nevertheless managed to remain within the recognized boundaries the party mainstream, polling more votes than any other candidate in elections to the Party Executive at the 1923 Party Conference.

Lindau was arrested in May 1924, following his participation in the Hamburg Uprising: he was held in investigative detention till December 1925. After this he became the district party leader in the Wasserkante ("Waterside") quarter of Hamburg, becoming involved in disputes with the party hierarchy in Hamburg whom he accused of party mismanagement: he was relieved of his party function and replaced by John Wittorf in February 1927. He continued to edit party newspapers till 1930, after which he devoted himself increasingly to historical scholarship alongside his newspaper work.

In January 1933 the NSDAP (Nazi Party) came to power and lost little time in transforming the country into a one-party dictatorship. Communist party membership and activity were banned. The Hitler government also revisited the fatal events of the previous summer's "Bloody Sunday" street confrontation in Altona. Rudolf Lindau's son (also called Rudolf Lindau) was one of the Communist demonstrators who had been arrested at the time, and were now tried for murder by a Nazi Court. The younger Rudolf Lindau (1911-1934), as a local Young Communist leader, was one of those found guilty of involvement: he was executed on 10 January. During 1933, while his son was imprisoned, Lindau undertook illegal political opposition work in Saxony using the name "Rudolf Grätz". At the end of February 1934 Rudolf he emigrated, initially to Czechoslovakia and from there to the Soviet Union. In the Soviet Union he continued to write on historical themes, now using the name "Paul Graetz".

Rudolf Lindau spent the twelve Nazi years in the Soviet Union. During this time, war broke out again. In the case of the war between Germany and the Soviet Union this occurred in June 1941, following repudiation from the German side of the non-aggression pact that the two dictatorships had concluded nearly two years earlier. During his time in Moscow Lindau taught at the Party Academy and, later, at the Anti-Fascist School set up for the re-education of German prisoners of war. He also worked in the Soviet sponsored National Committee for a Free Germany (NKFD / Nationalkomitee Freies Deutschland). Additionally, at the Krasnogorsk-based "Academy for Leninism" at, a short distance outside Moscow, he got to know Walter Ulbricht who by 1949 would have emerged as the leader of a new kind of German state.

The war ended in May 1945 and Lindau returned to what remained of Germany, ending up not back in Hamburg, but a couple of hundred kilometers further to the east, in what was now designated the Soviet occupation zone. Communist Party membership was no longer illegal, and he lost little time in becoming involved with The Party. In April 1946, following the contentious merger that created what would become the occupation zone's ruling SED (party), he was one of many thousand Communist Party members who lost no time in signing their memberships across to the new party. The SED was formed by merging the German Communist Party and, within the occupation zone, the more moderate Social Democratic party: in the first couple of years the authorities took care to present a semblance of parity between former members of the two constituent elements of the SED. In 1947 Lindau was appointed co-director of the new party's newly established "Karl Marx" Party Academy. His fellow co-director was a former SPD man called Paul Lenzner (1884-1955). In September or October 1950 both Rudolf Lindau and Paul Lenzner were removed from the Party Academy directorship, to be replaced by a single director, Hanna Wolf. By this time the Soviet administered occupation zone had been reinvented, formally in October 1949, as the Soviet sponsored German Democratic Republic.

On leaving his post at the Party Academy Lindau became an expert researcher at the Institute for Marxism–Leninism of the Party Central Committee.

In 1960 Lindau published a new book, entitled Revolutionäre Kämpfe 1918/19, which drew criticism from those around the leader. In his book he identified the German Revolution of 1918–19 as a Socialist revolution. The party line was that it had been a Middle-class revolution. The matter was evidently not merely one of semantics, but he refused the invitation to indulge in self-criticism, and struck stubbornly to his own interpretation, in contrast to other East German historians when confronted with these interpretational dilemmas. Lindau came under attack as a "Dogmatist".

== As evaluation ==
Lindau was one of a small but determined group of like-minded historians who promoted the orienting of historical seminars and institutions according to the precepts of East Germany's ruling Socialist Unity Party (SED / Sozialistische Einheitspartei Deutschlands). This was seen as necessary because, especially in the early years of the German Democratic Republic, the country's mainstream historians were drawn, for the most part, from outside the Marxist historical tradition. Nevertheless, in the judgement of Lothar Mertens, Rudolf Lindau - along with colleagues such as Horst Bartel, Walter Bartel, Karl Bittel and Albert Schreiner - lacked the necessary skill and rigour sufficiently to distance their academic output from the category of "mere" party propaganda.
