= Walter Bartel =

German resistance fighter, educator and historian (1904–1992)

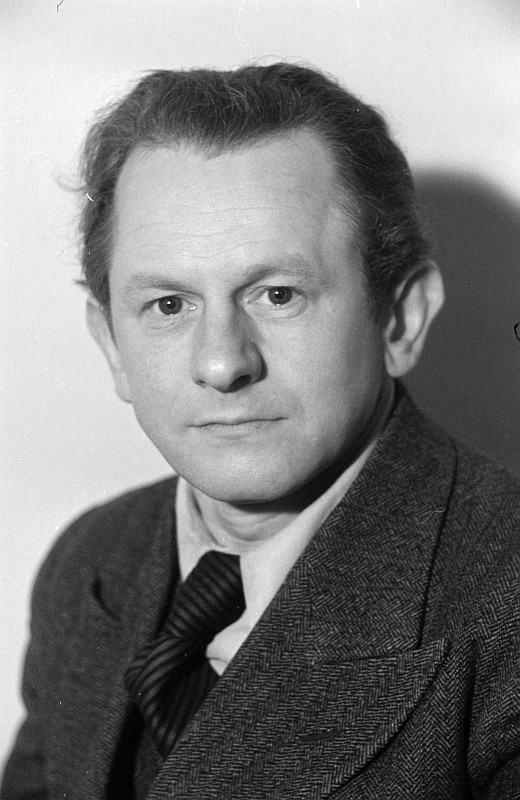
Bartel in 1947

Walter Bartel (15 September 1904 – 16 January 1992) was a German communist resistance fighter, historian and educator

== Life ==
Born on 15 September 1904, in Fürstenberg/Havel, in the Grand Duchy of Mecklenburg-Strelitz, Bartel grew up in a working-class family. Wilhelm Bartel, his father, worked in forestry.

Walter Bartel trained to be a merchant after attending Volksschule and Realschule. He joined the Young Communist League of Germany (KJVD) in 1920 (the same year it was created) and joined the Communist Party of Germany (KPD) in 1923. In 1927, he led the German delegation to the International Youth Congress in Moscow. In 1929, he began to study Marxism-Leninism at the Moscow International Lenin School and achieved the degree of Aspirantur there.

He returned to Germany in 1932. Here he participated in political resistance to the rising power of Nazism. On account of this illegal activity, he was charged with "Preparation for Treason" and sentenced to 27 months in a Zuchthaus, which he served from 1933 to 1935 at Brandenburg-Görden Prison. After his release, he emigrated to Czechoslovakia, but there he was expelled from the KPD for alleged treason.

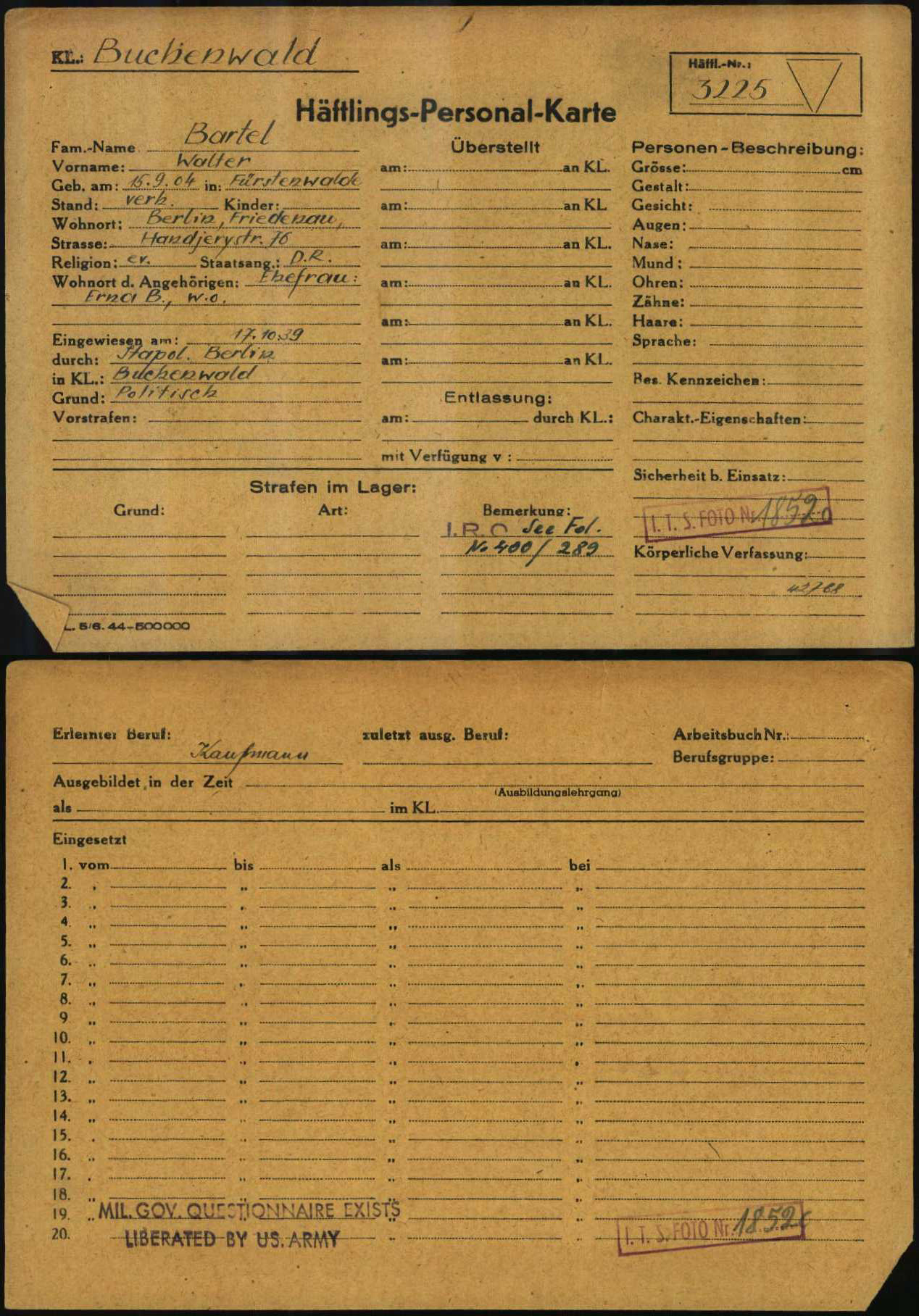
Registration card of Walter Bartel as a prisoner at Buchenwald Nazi Concentration Camp

In March 1939, the German occupying force arrested him and transported him to Buchenwald concentration camp. At Buchenwald, Bartel was employed by the Carpentry labourers and the department of labour statistics. Along with Ernst Busse and Harry Kuhn, he soon became part of the illegal party leadership at Buchenwald and, from 1943, he was the chairman of the International Camp Committee, which worked to co-ordinate resistance and escape attempts in the camp. When the approaching American troops enabled the liberation of the camp, he was recognised by the American camp commandants too as the equivalent of a rightful leader of the former camp.

After 1945, he was rehabilitated by the KDP (after several review procedures) and became a founding member of the Socialist Unity Party of Germany (SED). After a short stint as Head of Department for Popular Education for the Magistrat of Berlin, he became the personal advisor of Wilhelm Pieck for party activities. In 1953, he was investigated by the party again. After this he moved to academic work. He received a doctorate and became professor of Twentieth Century History at Leipzig University. From 1957 to 1962, he was Director of the Deutsches Institut für Zeitgeschichte (DIZ). After that he took up a lectureship in Twentieth Century History at Humboldt University in Berlin. In 1965, he became prorector for student affairs and in 1967 he received a chair. From the 1970s, he was deeply involved in the affairs of Buchenwald survivors and was Chairman of the Buchenwald Committee and a board member of the Committee of Anti-Fascist Resistance. From 1970, he was Deputy Chairman of the Internationalen Komitee Buchenwald-Dora und Kommandos.

As a historian he produced works on the anti-Fascist resistance of the left wing of the SDP, a standard work on the history of Buchenwald and on the Chairman of the KDP, Ernst Thälmann.

Walter Bartel and a small group of like-minded individuals sought to establish historical seminars and institutes in the DDR which conformed to the SED's regulations. The "Guild" of DDR Historians was not initially in the Marxist tradition. According to Lothar Mertens, Walter Bartel (like Horst Bartel, Karl Bittel, Rudolf Lindau and Albert Schreiner) lacked the necessary skill and rigour to sufficiently distance his academic output from the category of "mere" party propaganda.

== Honours ==
- 1964 Patriotic Order of Merit, Silver
- 1964 Johannes R. Becher-Medal
- 1969 Patriotic Order of Merit, Gold
- 1974 Order of Karl Marx
- 1979 Medal of the Soviet Committee of War Veterans
- 1984 Star of People's Friendship

== Bibliography ==
- Lutz Niethammer: Der "gesäuberte Antifaschismus". Die SED und die kommunistischen Kapos von Buchenwald. Berlin 1994
- Harry Stein, Gedenkstätte Buchenwald (Ed.): Konzentrationslager Buchenwald 1937–1945. Begleitband zur ständigen historischen Ausstellung, Wallstein Verlag, Göttingen 1999, ISBN 978-3-89244-222-6.
- Philipp Neumannn: "… eine Sprachregelung zu finden". Zur Kanonisierung des kommunistischen Buchenwald-Gedächtnisses in der Dokumentation Mahnung und Verpflichtung, in: Fritz Bauer Institut, Katharina Stengel (Ed.): Opfer als Akteure, Interventionen ehemaliger NS-Verfolgter in der Nachkriegszeit, Frankfurt (Main) 2008, pp. 151–173.
