= Lothar Mosler =

German historian (1913–1995)

Lothar Mosler (2 March 1913 – 28 November 1995) was a mainstream East German historian who arrived at his university career through the political route. Between 1953 and 1961 he served as director of the Franz Mehring Institute for training teachers in Marxist-Leninist Sociological Studies, which was a core (and for much of the time compulsory) base module for students at the Karl Marx University (as it was known between 1953 and 1991) of Leipzig. Between 1958 and his retirement in 1978 Prof. Mosler taught the History of the German Labour Movement at the university.

== Life ==
=== Provenance and early years ===
Lothar Gerhard Mosler was born in Ziegenhals (known, after 1944/45, as Głuchołazy), which was a small mining town on the southern frontier region of Upper Silesia. Max Mosler, his father, was a master carpenter and, later, a war pensioner. His mother, Sophie, was at one stage employed as a cook. He attended school in Ziegenhals between 1920 and 1928, moving on to the secondary school in Breslau (subsequently, since 1944/45, identified as Wrocław), successfully completing his schooling by passing his Abitur in 1933. His interest in politics was evidenced by his membership of the "Sozialistischer Schülerbund" between 1928 and 1930 and his role as a local leader with the Breslau Young Communists between 1930 and 1933.

=== National Socialism ===
In January 1933 the Hitler government took power and lost no time in transforming Germany into a one-party dictatorship. Communist involvement was outlawed and Mosler appears to have respected the changes. Between 1934 and 1939 he was a member of the government-backed Deutsche Arbeitsfront ("German Labour Front") which had been created by the new government to replace the now outlawed trades unions. Between 1934 and 1936 he undertook and completed commercial apprenticeship in salesmanship at the prestigious Wertheim department store in Breslau. He then worked successively as a cloths and materials salesman at the Zeeck department store in Dessau (1936–1937), the Bielschowsky department store in Breslau (1937–1938) and the Langenfeld department store in Braunschweig (1938–1939).

In 1939 war broke out and Mosler was conscripted into the army. He was assigned to the supplies unit of the 17th Infantry Division and took part in the invasion of Poland. Promoted to the rank of corporal, he remained with the regiment as an administrative assistant in the army clothes department when the regiment was switched to northern France in 1940 and then sent east in 1941 in the context of the invasion of the Soviet Union. He was awarded the "Ostmedaille" ("Eastern Front Medal") in 1942 and 1943 the "Kriegsverdienstkreuz" ("War Merit Cross") Class 2. In May 1945 he was captured by advancing Soviet troops at Teplice. However, he was held for barely a month, being released at Dresden (since May 1945 administered as part of the newly created Soviet occupation zone) on 13 June 1945.

=== Postwar ===
In the Fall/Autumn of 1945 Mosler secured a place on the fast-track New Teacher Scheme that the military administration had introduced to address the desperate shortage of school teachers that had been created both by the slaughter of war and by the reluctance of the occupation authorities to place confidence in anyone suspected of possible involvement with the National Socialists during the preceding twelve years. He then, in 1945/46 took over the headship of a primary school at Cunewalde which, following frontier changes mandated by the allied leaders, was now on the extreme south-eastern edge of Germany's Soviet occupation zone. Between 1946 and 1949 he served as an SED local councillor for the district of Löbau. During 1946/47 he also headed up the arts and culture department for Löbau district.

He joined the Communist Party in 1945 and then, following the contentious party merger of April 1946, was among the thousands who promptly signed their party membership across to the new Socialist Unity Party ("Sozialistische Einheitspartei Deutschlands") which had been created, it was explained, in order to ensure that political divisions on the political left could never again be exploited as a route to power by populists. Ironically, by the time the Soviet zone was relaunched in October 1949 as the Soviet-sponsored German Democratic Republic (East Germany), the SED had itself emerged as the ruling party in a new kind of German one-party dictatorship. It was an indication that he had been marked out for future advancement than between January and March 1947 he attended the regional SED party academy in nearby Ottendorf. He himself took over the headship at another regional party school, in Kleindehsa, between 1947 and 1949. Then, between October 1948 and April 1949, he was a student at the national Karl Marx Party Academy at Hakeburg Manor in Kleinmachnow, just outside Berlin.

In 1949 Mosler was appointed to a lectureship at the "Walter Ulbricht" Law Academy ("Deutsche Akademie für Staats- und Rechtswissenschaft...") in Forst Zinna. The lectureship was accompanied by a position as "Party secretary" at the academy. In 1951 he completed a three month teacher training course at Eberswalde for university teaching for the important Marxist-Leninist Sociological Studies curriculum. That opened the way for a transfer to the Karl Marx University at Leipzig which was one of the top universities in East Germany, with a particular focus on critical political subjects such as Journalism and History.

=== Leipzig years ===
In 1951 Mosler accepted a lectureship in Marxist-Leninist Sociological Studies at the university's Institute for Journalism and Newspaper Studies. This was accompanied by a parallel appointment as a member of the party leadership group at the university's wide-ranging Philosophy Faculty. In 1953 he became director and a lecturer on the History of the German Labour Movement at the university's Franz Mehring Institute. On 22 March 1958 he received his doctorate in return for a dissertation on "The Strike of the Port Workers and Seamen in Hamburg-Altona 1896/97". The work was produced under the supervision of Professors Ernst Engelberg and Walter Markov.

Following receipt of his doctorate Mosler accepted a professorship, still at the Karl Marx University of Leipzig, with the focus of his teaching still on the History of the Labour Movement. Between 1959 and 1964 he served as Prorector for Marxist-Leninist Sociological Studies and First Deputy University Rector. In 1961 he resigned from his role as director of the university's Franz Mehring Institute, and in the same year became a member of the Senate Commission on Social Sciences. In 1966 he accepted a teaching professorship in the History of the German Labour Movement at the national Marxism-Leninism Institute. In 1969 he undertook a five month leave of absence in order to undertake a piece of study at the University of Kiev on the History of the Soviet Communist Party.

Mosler's teaching work continued to be complemented by various administrative and political positions and responsibilities. Between 1959 and 1968 he was a member of the party leadership team ("SED-Kreisleitung") at the Karl Marx University. He also served, between 1958 and 1970, as a member of the Leipzig District Council ("Abgeordneter des Bezirkstages Leipzig"): he also chaired the council's Commission on Popular Education ("... Kommission Volksbildung"). On a national level, between 1971 and 1978 he belonged to the Commission for the Theology Section at the Ministry for Higher Education and Vocational Training ("Ministerium für das Hoch- und Fachschulwesen..."). In addition, from 1965 he was a member of the "Kulturbund", a state-backed all-embracing umbrella organisation to which a large number of East German arts and culture-related organisations in need of approval were affiliated. The "Kulturbund" was a mass organisation which under the centralised Leninist power structure in force, and subject to the relentless control of the ruling SED (party), enjoyed some of the characteristics and privileges of a political party. It was as a representative delegate from the "Kulturbund" that Lothar Mosler held both his membership of the Leipzig District Council and, from as far back as 1959, his membership of the prestigious "Urania" East German Society for the Dissemination of Academic Knowledge.

Lothar Mosler retired from his professorship on 1 September 1978.

== Awards and honours (selection) ==
- 1954 Medal for outstanding work ("Medaille für ausgezeichnete Leistungen")
- 1961 Service Medal ("Verdienstmedaille der DDR")
- 1961 Lapel Badge of Honour from the Karl Marx University of Leipzig
- 1971 Patriotic Order of Merit in Bronze ("Vaterländischer Verdienstorden...")
- 1974 de:Verdienter Hochschullehrer der Deutschen Demokratischen RepublikUniversity Teacher Merit Award
- 1978 de:Johannes-R.-Becher-MedailleJohannes R. Becher Medal in Gold
- 1979 Lapel Badge of Honour from the National Front (alliance of recognised political pasrties and mass organisations)
- 1989 Medal of Honour on the Fortieth Anniversary of the German Democratic Republic

== Publications (selection) ==
- Der Streik der Hafenarbeiter und Seeleute in Hamburg-Altona im Jahre 1896/97. Diss phil. Karl-Marx-Universität, 1958.
- Zur Entwicklung und Arbeit des Franz-Mehring-Instituts. Beiträge zur Universitätsgeschichte. Verlag Enzyklopädie, Leipzig 1959.
- Die demokratischen Bewegungen der Gegenwart und die sozialistische Revolution. Sonderdruck des Staatssekretariats für das Hochschulwesen. Berlin 1961.
- Die rechten Führer der SPD und der Neokolonialismus. In: Nationaler Befreiungskampf und Neokolonialismus. Referate und ausgewählte Beiträge.(Wissenschaftliche Konferenz vom 5. bis 8. April 1961 in Leipzig). Akademie-Verlag, Berlin 1962.
- Einige Fragen der Entwicklung des Revisionismus in der deutschen Sozialdemokratie vor dem 1. Weltkrieg. In: Beiträge für das gesellschaftswissenschaftliche Grundstudium, 1963 (2) section 3, pp. 33–41.
