= Alois Pisnik =

Austrian-born East German politician

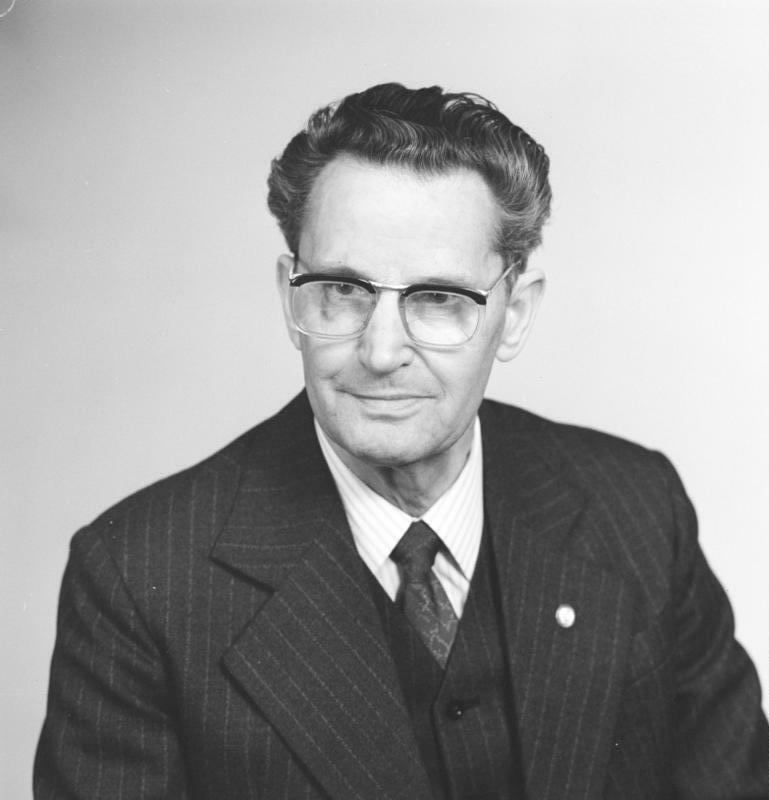
- Pisnik in 1986

First Secretary of the Socialist Unity Party in Bezirk Magdeburg
- In office 1 August 1952 – 11 February 1979
- Second Secretary: Heinz Steigerwald; Kurt Wagner; Rudi Kornagel; Werner Guse; Walter Ladebeck; Walter Kirnich
- Preceded by: Bernard Koenen (as First Secretary of the SED in Saxony-Anhalt)
- Succeeded by: Kurt Tiedke
Volkskammer
Member of the Volkskammer for Halberstadt, Wernigerode
In office 3 December 1958 – 5 April 1990
Preceded by	multi-member district
Succeeded by	Constituency abolished

Personal details
- Born: Alois Pisnik; 8 September 1911 Donawitz, Styria, Austria-Hungary (now Leoben, Styria, Austria)
- Died: 2 October 2004 (aged 93) Rostock, Mecklenburg-Vorpommern, Germany
- Party: Socialist Unity Party (1946–1989)
- Other political affiliations: Communist Party of Germany (1945–1946); Communist Party of Austria (1933–1945); Social Democratic Workers' Party of Austria (1928–1933)
- Occupation: Politician; Party Functionary; Machinist
- Central institution membership: 1958–1963: Candidate member, Politburo of the Central Committee; 1950–1989: Full member, Central Committee; Other offices held: 1980–1990: Member, State Council; 1960–1979: Member, National Defence Council; 1951–1952: Second Secretary, Socialist Unity Party in Saxony-Anhalt

Alois Pisnik (8 September 1911 – 2 October 2004) was an Austrian-born East German politician.

== Life and career ==
In his younger years, Pisnik was member of various social-democratic youth and trade union organizations. He joined the SDAPÖ in 1928. From 1926 to 1929 he finished an apprenticeship as a machinist. Subsequently, in 1933, after another three years of training, he received a qualification as an electrical engineer. In 1934 he participated in the Austrian Civil War, in the course of which he was arrested, but freed soon after. After the Anschluss, Pisnik was yet again arrested, this time by the Nazis, and consequently sentenced to 10 years prison.

After his liberation he soon became First Secretary of the SED district chapter in Magdeburg, an office he held until 1979. Concurrently, he was a member of the district parliament of Magdeburg from 1952 to 1958. Pisnik was known as one of the longest serving members of the SED Central Committee, having been part of it from 1950 to 1989. He was also a candidate of the SED Politburo from 1958 to 1963, a member of the People's Chamber from 1958 to 1990 and a member of the National Defense Council of East Germany from 1960 to 1979.
