= Karl Hengerer =

- Born: 4 April 1863; Hessigheim (Besigheim), Württemberg
- Died: 25 June 1943 (aged 80); Stuttgart, Germany
- Occupation: Architect

Karl Hengerer (4 April 1863 – 25 June 1943) was a German architect.

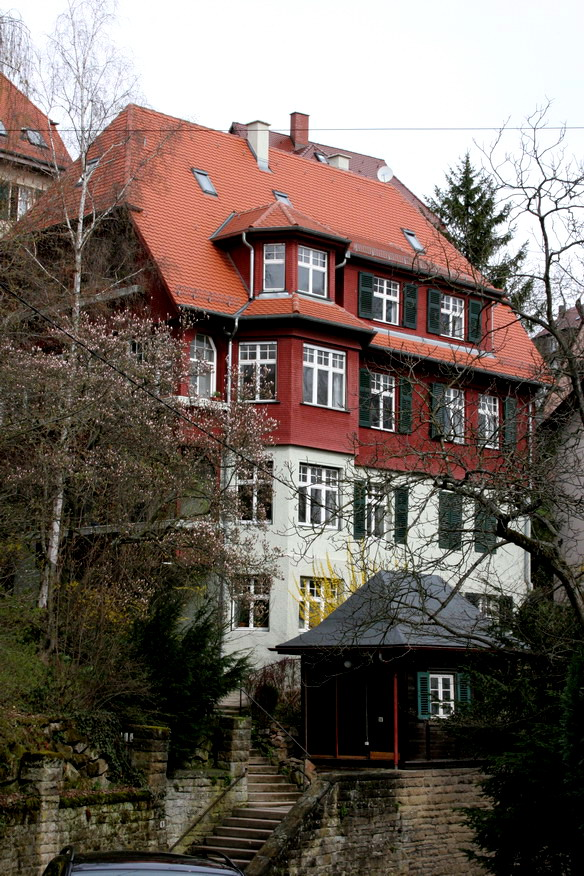
The Birkendörfle residential development (1907-1911) takes style cues from "traditional" Black Forest houses

== Life ==
Karl Christian Hengerer was born in Hessigheim (Besigheim), a small village approximately 25 km (16 miles) north of Stuttgart, the only recorded child of a Protestant stone mason who shortly after his son's birth became self-employed, setting himself up as a building contractor in Stuttgart.

Between 1882 and 1885 Hengerer studied architecture with Christian Friedrich von Leins at the Stuttgart Technical Academy (subsequently integrated into Stuttgart University). In 1884, while a student, he became a member of the Musical Student Fraternity ( Sängerschaft Schwaben). There followed a brief period working in Cologne with an architect called Emil Schreiterer before he returned in 1888 to Stuttgart where he successfully undertook the second level examination for the "Government Master Builder" ("Regierungsbaumeister") qualification.

As a result of his contribution to the redevelopment and reconfiguration of central Stuttgart (die bauliche Entwicklung und Gestaltung Stuttgarts in the words of the official citation) on 9 January 1904 Karl Hengerer was given the title "City Planning Commissioner" by King William II of Württemberg. Between 1891 and 1893 Hengerer worked in a partnership with an architect called Karl Heim (1859–1944) Between 1902 and 1906 he was working in partnership with Richard Katz. By 1920 he had become prosperous. He died in Stuttgart in 1943.

== Work ==
Between 1890 and 1919 between 400 and 500 buildings were constructed according to plans drawn up by Karl Hengerer. That is not the only reason he is considered one of Stuttgart's most influential Master Builders. Many of his developments, whether individual buildings or larger scale housing developments, received considerable attention in the contemporary specialist press: some of his work attracted controversy. A century later, however, as a result of war destruction, subsequent redevelopments and other demolitions, more than half of his buildings have been destroyed.

His most important output involved residential developments between 1890 and 1919, including numerous residential villas on the hillsides directly beyond what was then the built extent of Stuttgart. He also completed contracts for several banks and other commercial buildings in Württemberg. His early work reflects the Gothic and Renaissance revival structures typical of the period. However, from around 1900 he was demonstrating increasing inventiveness and use of more sculptured shapes in his facades, developing in the process an increasingly distinctive and personal style.

Hengerer's overall body of work remains traditional and conservative, but he was able to incorporate modern trends in respects of materials, and details of style and decor, while always remaining faithful to the existing built character of the region. Between 1898 and about 1905 he was drawing inspiration not only from the Gothic and Renaissance revivals, but also from the growing interest in craft traditions. Deeply inset windows, sharply contoured details and bold shapes acknowledged dignified bourgeois traditions, while he was able to resist the fashion for endless glazed brickwork and superfluous attachments.

From 1904, with the Theodor Fischer increasingly influential across southern Germany, Henegerer's own later work took a more patriotic-romantic direction, with bay windows, arcades and half timbered effects. Some of these developments are apparent in his still assertive Villa Hauff (1904) and are most visible today in the "Stuttgart old town redevelopment" (1906–1909) with the Earl Eberhart ("Graf-Eberhard") development. It was under these romantic revival influences that he produced the Birkendörfle residential development (1907–1911), applying the style of traditional Black Forest houses.

Soon after this he returned to a heavier neo-baroque look, which was becoming increasingly prevalent across Germany directly before the First World War. He never followed the trend towards more overtly functional post imperial architecture which took hold after the German Revolution of 1918–19.

In terms simply of quantity, Hengerer's greatest output involved much social residential accommodation which proliferated in Stuttgart between 1891 and 1910. His principal client-partner in this work was the banker turned philanthropist and social reformer Eduard Pfeiffer (1835–1921) in connection with Pfeiffer's "Association for the Welfare of the Working Classes". Together they constructed large scale affordable housing developments at Stuttgart-Ostheim (1891–1895) and Stuttgart-Südheim (1901–1903) as well as Stuttgart-Ostenau (1911–1913. The "old town" redevelopment was also undertaken on the initiative of Pfeiffer.
