= Hanna Wolf =

East German historian and politician (1908–1999)

Principal of the "Karl Marx" Party Academy
- In office 12 September 1950 – 23 June 1983
- Deputy: Manfred Herold; Ernst Haak
- Preceded by: Rudolf Lindau
- Succeeded by: Kurt Tiedke

Personal details
- Born: Hanna Haschka; 4 February 1908 Gonionds, Congress Poland, Russian Empire (now Goniądz, Poland)
- Died: 22 June 1999 (aged 91) Berlin, Germany
- Party: Socialist Unity Party (1948–1989)
- Other political affiliations: Communist Party of Germany (1930–1948); Party of Democratic Socialism (1989–1990)
- Domestic partner: Wilhelm Knigge
- Education: University of Berlin (no degree); International Lenin School
- Occupation: Teacher; Party Functionary
- Awards: Patriotic Order of Merit, 1st class; Banner of Labor; Clara Zetkin Medal; Order of Karl Marx; Hero of Labour
- Central institution membership: 1958–1989: Full member, Central Committee; 1954–1958: Candidate member, Central Committee; Other offices held: 1958–1989: Member, Ideological Commission at the Politburo; 1950–1976: Member, Einheit editorial team

Hanna Wolf (née Haschka; 4 February 1908 – 22 June 1999) was an East German historian and socialist politician. She left Germany in 1932 for the Soviet Union where she became a Soviet citizen. She returned to East Germany in 1947 and held various posts, including rector of Parteihochschule Karl Marx (Party Academy Karl Marx). She was a long-term member of the central committee of the Socialist Unity Party (SED).

== Early life and education ==
She was born in Goniądz, Poland, on 4 February 1908. Her father was a rabbi and teacher, and her mother was also a teacher. In 1922 she became a member of the Polish branch of the Young Communist League of Germany. She studied philosophy and history at the University of Berlin.

== Career and exile ==
Following her graduation she worked as a teacher. She left the Jewish community in 1927. She joined the Communist Party of Germany in 1930. She emigrated to the Soviet Union in April 1932 after the Nazi Party had started to gain power. She became a Soviet citizen in 1934 and started to become involved in scientific research. Between 1942 and 1947 she was a teacher at the Central School for German War Prisoners in Krasnogorsk, Moscow Oblast.

Wolf moved back to East Germany in 1947 and held several posts. She first worked at the Central Administration for Public Education before she became a citizen of East Germany in 1950. In September of that year she was appointed rector of the Party Academy Karl Marx run by the SED and remained in office until June 1983. She did, however, not publish any research work. She became a candidate member of the SED's central committee in 1954. She was made its full member in 1958 which she held until 1989. She was also promoted to professorship in 1958. From 1983 to 1989 she acted as a consultant at the central committee of the SED. She was one of the most influential Stalinist members of the SED.

Wolf joined the Party of Democratic Socialism, successor of the SED, but she was expelled from the party on 10 February 1990.

== Personal life and death ==
Wolf married three times. She died in Berlin on 22 June 1999.

=== Awards ===
Wolf was the recipient of the following: Soviet medal of Fatherland (1946), Banner of Labor (1959), Clara Zetkin Medal (1964), Order of Karl Marx (1965; 1978), Patriotic Order of Merit (Gold; 1968), Soviet Order of the Fatherland (1970) and Lenin Commemorative Medal (1970).
