= Theodor Bergmann (agronomist) =

German author

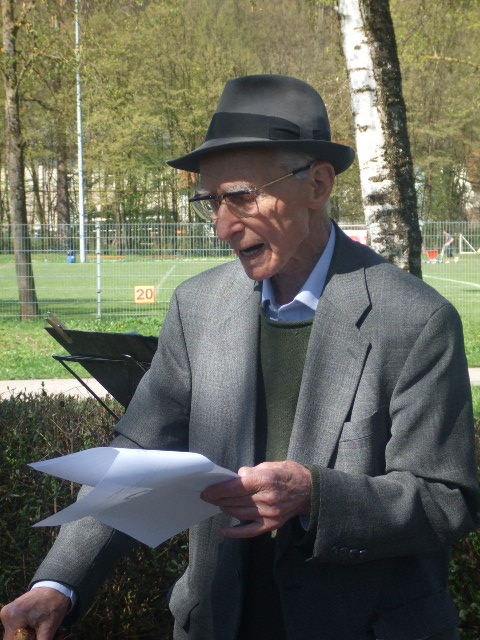
Theodor Bergmann holding an address in memory of Georg Elser, who had attempted to assassinate Hitler. April 19, 2009; Heidenheim-Schnaitheim

Theodor Bergmann (Berlin, March 7, 1916 – Stuttgart, June 12, 2017) was a German agronomist and published author. Until 1981 he was Professor for international comparisons in agrarian policy at University of Hohenheim. Bergmann was “the last participant and eyewitness to the German labor movement of the Weimar era”.

== Life ==
=== Family and early years ===
Seventh son of a Berlin rabbi, Judah Bergmann, Theodor Bergmann was born the youngest brother of Alfred Bergmann, Ernst David Bergmann, and Felix Bergmann. Growing up in Berlin, he joined Jungspartakusbund and Sozialistischer Schülerbund in 1927. In 1929, he joined the KJVD-O, youth organization of the just-established KPDO. In 1933, he just made it to finish his Abitur, but had to emigrate as a consequence of Hitler's Machtergreifung.

=== Exile and return ===
Crossing the Saarland, he fled to a kibbutz in British Palestine. From there, he went to Děčín, Sudetenland in the northern Czechoslovak Republic in 1935, where he studied agricultural science. All the while, he was an active anti-fascist, producing and helping smuggle and distribute leaflets into near Germany. After the 1938 Munich Agreement, he fled on to Sweden, where he led structures of the KP-Opposition, and was active in the Landesgruppe Deutscher Gewerkschafter in Schweden (national organization of German unionists in Sweden).

Having returned to Germany in 1946, in 1947 he earned his degree in agricultural science in Bonn, acquiring a doctorate degree at University of Hohenheim in 1955, reflecting on the structural transformation of agriculture in Sweden.

=== Profession and leadership ===
In 1965, after working as an adult educator and by order of the Chamber of Agriculture in Hannover, he entered service at University of Hohenheim as research associate. Passing his state doctorship in 1968, he conducted a guest professorship at University of New England (Australia) in Armidale, New South Wales. Returning to University of Hohenheim, in 1973 he received the professorship for international comparative studies in agrarian politics.

At University of Hohenheim, he was one of a few professors speaking on behalf of marxist students prone to regulations of the Radikalenerlass laws, that maintained to target various forms of extremism, but was mainly anti-communist in nature. Following his 1981 retirement, he turned towards exploring the history of proletarian movements, focusing especially on the KPO.

In the post-war period, he was a leading member of the KPO's successor organization, the Gruppe Arbeiterpolitik (GAP). 1948 through 1952 he had been the publisher of their periodical Arbeiterpolitik. During all his post-emeritus life, he has been an active contributor to leftist workers' union movements. In 1990, he had joined PDS and ran for them in 1990 Bundestag elections. In 1990/'91, he also was the president of PDS's Baden-Württemberg regional association. In 2007, he became member of Die Linke.

Bergmann authored, edited and translated more than 50 books pertaining to agronomics and the history of international proletarian movements. His contributions to the history of workers' movements were released by VSA-Verlag in Hamburg. Additionally, he authored a number of contributions for Historical-Critical Dictionary of Marxism.

Lastly, he lived in Stuttgart, where he died aged 101 after short illness.

== Publications ==
- Wandlungen der landwirtschaftlichen Betriebsstruktur in Schweden Berlin 1956
- Wiederaufsplitterung nach der Flurbereinigung in Unterfranken. Bielefeld 1958 (mit Ludwig Neckermann)
- Die landwirtschaftliche Bevölkerung im System der Sozialversicherung. Ein internationaler Vergleich. Göttingen 1960
- Stand und Formen der Mechanisierung der Landwirtschaft in den asiatischen Ländern. Teil 2. Südasien. Stuttgart 1966
- Funktionen und Wirkungsgrenzen von Produktionsgenossenschaften in Entwicklungsländern. Frankfurt 1967
- Die Genossenschaftsbewegung in Indien. Geschichte, Leistungen, Aufgaben. Frankfurt 1971. ISBN 3-7819-2408-4
- 50 Jahre KPD (Opposition): December 30, 1928 – December 30, 1978; der Beitrag der KPO zur marxistischen Theorie und zur Geschichte der deutschen Arbeiterbewegung. Versuch einer kritischen Würdigung. Hannover 1978 ISBN 3-88209-009-X
- Agrarpolitik und Agrarwirtschaft sozialistischer Länder. 2. üb. Aufl. Saarbrücken 1979. ISBN 3-88156-115-3
- Sozialistische Agrarpolitik. Köln 1984. (with Peter Gey and Wolfgang Quaisser) ISBN 3-7663-0892-0
- Die Geschwister Thalheimer. Skizzen ihrer Leben und Politik. Mainz 1993 (mit Wolfgang Haible) ISBN 3-929455-12-9
- Von der Utopie zur Kritik. Friedrich Engels – ein Klassiker nach 100 Jahren. Hamburg 1996 (Hrsg., gemeinsam mit Mario Keßler, Joost Kircz und Gert Schäfer) ISBN 3-87975-688-0
- mit Wolfgang Haible Hg.: Reform, Demokratie, Revolution. Zur Aktualität von Rosa Luxemburg. Supplement zu Sozialismus (Zeitschrift) H. 5, Hamburg 1997 ISBN 3-87975-921-9
- Der Widerschein der Russischen Revolution. Ein kritischer Rückblick auf das Jahr 1917 und die Folgen. Hamburg 1997. (Hrsg., gemeinsam mit Wladislaw Hedeler, Mario Keßler und Gert Schäfer) ISBN 3-87975-704-6
- Friedrich Westmeyer. Von der Sozialdemokratie zum Spartakusbund. Eine politische Biographie. Hamburg 1998. (mit Wolfgang Haible und Galina Iwanowa) ISBN 3-87975-719-4
- Ketzer im Kommunismus. 23 biographische Essays. Hamburg 2000 (Hrsg., gemeinsam mit Mario Keßler)
- Im Jahrhundert der Katastrophen. Autobiographie eines kritischen Kommunisten. Hamburg 2000 ISBN 3-87975-784-4 (3., aktualisierte und ergänzte Auflage 2016, ISBN 978-3-89965-688-6)
- Gegen den Strom. Die Geschichte der KPD (Opposition). Hamburg 2001 ISBN 3-87975-836-0
- Geschichte wird gemacht. Soziale Triebkräfte und internationale Arbeiterbewegung im 21. Jahrhundert. Hamburg 2002. (Hrsg., gemeinsam mit Wolfgang Haible und Gert Schäfer) ISBN 3-87975-888-3
- Krise und Zukunft des Kibbutz. Weinheim 2002. (gemeinsam mit Ludwig Liegle) ISBN 3-7799-1020-9
- Die Thalheimers. Geschichte einer Familie undogmatischer Marxisten. Hamburg 2004. ISBN 3-89965-059-X
- Rotes China im 21. Jahrhundert. Hamburg 2004. ISBN 3-89965-098-0
- China entdeckt Rosa Luxemburg. Berlin 2007. ISBN 3-320-02101-X
- "Klassenkampf & Solidarität". Geschichte der Stuttgarter Metallarbeiter. Hamburg 2007, ISBN 978-3-89965-236-9
- Internationalismus im 21. Jahrhundert. Lernen aus Niederlagen – für eine neue internationale Solidarität. Hamburg 2009, ISBN 978-3-89965-354-0.
- Internationalisten an den antifaschistischen Fronten. Spanien, China, Vietnam Hamburg 2009, ISBN 978-3-89965-367-0
- Weggefährten. Gesprächspartner – Lehrer – Freunde – Helfer eines kritischen Kommunisten. Hamburg 2010, ISBN 978-3-89965-443-1.
- Der 100-jährige Krieg um Israel. Eine internationalistische Position zum Nahostkonflikt. Hamburg 2011, ISBN 978-3-89965-460-8
- Strukturprobleme der kommunistischen Bewegung. Irrwege – Kritik – Erneuerung. Hamburg 2012, ISBN 978-3-89965-492-9
- Sozialisten Zionisten Kommunisten: Die Familie Bergmann-Rosenzweig – eine kämpferische Generation im 20. Jahrhundert. Hamburg 2014, ISBN 978-3-89965-615-2

An extensive bibliography can be found in the brochure: Die Tradition kritischer Solidarität von Luxemburg bis Gorbatschow, Pankower Vorträge, Heft 200, hrsg. v. Helle Panke, Berlin 2016, S. 24–60.
