= Horst Bartel =

German historian (1928–1984)

- Born: 16 January 1928; Cottbus, Germany
- Died: 22 June 1984 (aged 56); East Berlin, East Germany
- Education: Humboldt University of Berlin
- Occupation: Historian
- Political party: SED
- Awards: National Prize of East Germany, Patriotic Order of Merit

Horst Bartel (16 January 1928 – 22 June 1984) was a German historian and university professor. He was involved in most of the core historiography projects undertaken in the German Democratic Republic (1949–1989). His work on the nineteenth-century German Labour movement places him firmly in the mainstream tradition of Marxist–Leninist historical interpretation.

== Life ==
Horst Bartel was born in Cottbus. His father worked in street construction. By the time Bartel left school, in 1942, war had broken out. He started a teacher training course at Orlau in Upper Silesia, but he left the course in 1944 without completing it. In the meantime, in 1943 he joined the Hitler Youth organisation, and during the same year was conscripted for National Labour Service. As Germany's eastern frontier moved west to the accompaniment of industrial scale ethnic cleansing, he appears to have moved west; in 1945 he was captured by the Americans who held him as a prisoner of war between May and September 1945, initially at Heilbronn and subsequently at Linz.

Between September 1945 and 1946 Bartel worked as a messenger at a hospital in Cottbus. In April 1946 he was one of many thousands in what had by now become Germany's Soviet occupation zone to join the newly formed Socialist Unity Party of Germany (SED / Sozialistische Einheitspartei Deutschlands) which a few years later would become the ruling party for a new standalone "East German" state. Later the same year he embarked on an accelerated on-the-job teacher-training course. The course included work as a teacher at a primary school at Peitz, a small town a short distance to the north of Cottbus. In Bartel's case, however, teaching was quickly superseded, still in 1946, by a period of university level study at Berlin's Humboldt University, focusing on history, German studies and pedagogy. His student studies continued until 1949.

=== Selected publications ===
==== Monographs and essays ====
- Friedrich Engels' Kampf für die Schaffung einer marxistischen Arbeiterpartei in Deutschland. Engels-Konferenz Berlin 1955. 1st edition Dietz, Berlin 1956.
- Die richtungsweisende Hilfe von Karl Marx und Friedrich Engels für die Zeitung "Der Sozialdemokrat" im Kampf um die revolutionäre Einheit der Partei in der Periode des Sozialistengesetzes. (Dissertation: Institut für Gesellschaftswissenschaften beim ZK der SED, Berlin 1956)
- Marx und Engels im Kampf um ein revolutionäres deutsches Parteiorgan. Zu einigen Problemen der Hilfe von Karl Marx und Friedrich Engels für den Kampf des "Sozialdemokrat" gegen das Sozialistengesetz. Dietz Verlag, Berlin 1961
- in the "Autorenkollektiv": August Bebel. Eine Biographie. 1st edition Dietz, Berlin 1963.
- August Bebel - ein Leben für den Kampf um den Sozialismus. In: Einheit. Dietz Verlag, Berlin, 1963, p. 105 ff.
- Die Durchsetzung des Marxismus in der deutschen Arbeiterbewegung im letzten Drittel des 19. Jahrhunderts. Probleme der zweiten Hauptperiode der Geschichte der deutschen Arbeiterbewegung. In: Zeitschrift für Geschichtswissenschaft. Vol. 14, Berlin 1966, pp. 1334–1371 ISSN 0044-2828
- Der interne Juni-Entwurf zum Erfurter Programm. In: International review of social history. Produced by Internationaal Instituut voor Sociale Geschiedenis. Vol. 12, Amsterdam 1967, P. 292-302 ISSN 0020-8590
- Arbeiterbewegung und Reichsgründung. Akademie-Verl, Berlin 1971.
- Karl Kautsky. Sein Anteil an der Entstehung und Propagierung des Erfurter Programms. In: Gustav Seeber: Gestalten der Bismarckzeit. Vol. 1. Akademie-Verlag, Berlin 1978, p. 426-453.
- with Wolfgang Schröder and Gustav Seeber: Das Sozialistengesetz 1878 - 1890. Illustrierte Geschichte des Kampfes der Arbeiterklasse gegen das Ausnahmegesetz. Dietz, Berlin 1980.
- with Dieter Fricke and Peter Bachmann: Wörterbuch der Geschichte. Dietz, Berlin 1983.

==== As editor / compiler ====
- Deutsche Geschichte in Daten.. Deutscher Verlag der Wissenschaften, Berlin 1967.
- Sachwörterbuch der Geschichte Deutschlands und der deutschen Arbeiterbewegung. 2 volumes. Dietz Verlag, Berlin 1969–1970.
- Geschichte. Lehrbuch der Oberschule. 1969 edition. Volk und Wissen, Berlin 1969.
- Marxismus und deutsche Arbeiterbewegung. Studien zur sozialistischen Bewegung im letzten Drittel des 19. Jahrhunderts. Dietz Verlag, Berlin 1970.
- Arbeiterbewegung und Reichsgründung. Akademie-Verlag, Berlin 1971.
- with Ernst Engelberg: Die großpreußisch-militaristische Reichsgründung 1871. Voraussetzungen und Folgen. 2 volumes, Akademie-Verlag, Berlin 1971.

In 1949 Bartel became a teacher, and then a school head, in Wandlitz, just outside Berlin on its north side. Between July and September 1950 he then undertook a training course at the Regional Party Academy in Schmerwitz, before being an appointed, in 1951, Schools Advisor (Stadtschulrat) in the important Potsdam District. That same year he started a higher level study course at the Party Central Committee's Social Sciences Institute (Akademie für Gesellschaftswissenschaften beim ZK der SED / IfG). This led him to a doctorate, awarded in February 1956. The subject matter for his doctoral dissertation was the work of Karl Marx and Friedrich Engels for the newspaper Der Sozialdemokrat during the period of the Anti-Socialist Laws (1878 - 1890).

Between 1956 and 1960 he worked as a lecturer, while at the same time heading up the teaching department at the IfG. In 1960, on the recommendation of Ernst Engelberg, Bartel took over as Director of the Institute. He was also appointed deputy director of the Historical Institute of the (East) German Academy of Sciences, an appointment made despite opposition from the Academy founder and well regarded economist Jürgen Kuczynski. From 1966 Bartel also served as associate professor with a teaching post and a professorial chair covering the History of the German Labour Movement at the important Party Central Committee's Social Sciences Institute / Academy (IfG/AfG).

From 1956 till 1959 Bartel was a member of the editorial collective on the Journal for Historical Science (Zeitschrift für Geschichtswissenschaft). He then joined the editorial collective of the academic journal Contributions to the History of the German Labour Movement (Beiträge zur Geschichte der deutschen Arbeiterbewegung), remaining with the journal until his death. Between 1967 and 1973 he was the editor of the History Yearbook (Jahrbuch für Geschichte). A further academic followed in 1969 when he received his habilitation for a work entitled "A Study of Contributions to the History of the Implementation of Marxism in the German Labour Movement during the final third of the Nineteenth Century" ("Studie Beiträge zur Geschichte der Durchsetzung des Marxismus in der deutschen Arbeiterbewegung im letzten Drittel des 19. Jahrhunderts"). It was also in 1969 (again in the teeth of opposition from Kuczynski and others) that he was appointed to succeed Ernst Engelberg as director of the Historical Institute at the German Academy of Sciences, a position he retained until his death in 1984.

Horst Bartel provided information to the Ministry for State Security as a Gesellschaftlicher Mitarbeiter Sicherheit (a professionally high ranking category of informal Stasi collaborator). At the same time he served as deputy chairman of the National History Council. He became a corresponding fellow of the German Academy of Sciences in 1969, progressing to a full fellowship in 1972. From 1975 he chaired the German Democratic Republic section of the German-Soviet Historical Commission. It was in this capacity that in 1977 he undertook an extended study visit to Moscow, and in 1982 he became a foreign member of the Soviet Academy of Sciences (as it was then known). Also in 1982 he became an associate professor of the Humboldt University in Berlin.

== Evaluation ==
Horst Bartel was one of an initially small minority of committed communists in the Soviet occupation zone of Germany (from 1949 the German Democratic Republic) at the end of the war who not only worked together on constructing historical seminars and institutes, but together transformed the context of historical study so that it might comply with the precepts of the East German ruling Socialist Unity Party of Germany (SED / Sozialistische Einheitspartei Deutschlands).

Lothar Merthens, a prolific historian who was also noted as an uncompromising critic of the German Democratic Republic and its one party dictatorship, contended that Bartel, along with like-minded colleagues such as Walter Bartel, Karl Bittel, Rudolf Lindau and Albert Schreiner, lacked necessary academic competence, and that even within party corridors were widely viewed as simple propagandists.

== Awards and honours ==
- 1966 National Prize of East Germany 1st class for science and technology
- 1979 Patriotic Order of Merit in silver
