= Fritz Hartung =

German historian (1883–1967)

- Born: 12 January 1883; Saarmund, Germany
- Died: 24 November 1967 (aged 84); Berlin, East Germany
- Occupations: History Professor and Writer

Fritz Hartung (12 January 1883 – 24 November 1967) was a political and constitutional historian of Germany.

== Life ==
Fritz Hartung was born in Saarmund, a short distance to the west of Potsdam. His father worked in the Prussian government service. However, he attended secondary school far to the west in Freiburg (1892–1900), and then in Berlin (1900–1901) where he passed his school final exams (Abitur). He went on to study history at Heidelberg and Berlin, with a particular focus on constitutional and legal history. He was taught by a number of the leading historians of the time including Gustav Schmoller, Heinrich Brunner and Otto Hintze. It was Hintze who supervised him at Berlin for his doctorate, received in 1905, for a dissertation on Hardenburg and the Prussian administration of Ansbach-Bayreuth between 1792 and 1806. After receiving his doctorate Hartung obtained a post as a research assistant at the Centre for Franconian History, based in Würzburg. During this period he was encouraged by the historian Richard Fester to focus on the history of the so-called Franconian Circle, and his work on this theme, supervised by Fester, provided the basis for his habilitation, awarded in 1910. Fester was associated with various universities through the years, but in 1908 he had become a full professor at Halle, and it was from Halle that Hartung received this higher degree for a work adapted and published shortly afterwards as "The History of the Franconian Circle 1521–1559". In 1914 his book on constitutional history during the previous 4 centuries appeared. It became a much revisited core textbook: the seventh edition was published, posthumously, in 1969, and it enabled Hartung to be identified as one of the most important and influential German constitutional historians of the twentieth century.

In 1915 Hartung was conscripted into an infantry regiment to serve as a soldier in the war which had started the previous year, but the next year he was released from military service on grounds of illness. In 1917 he joined the Free Conservative Party (Freikonservative Partei / FKP), a small traditionalist splinter party, liberal in matters of trade and industry, and in favour of a British-style imperial policy, but with an agenda that no longer made much sense in the post-imperial revolutionary period that followed the end of the war: the FKP dissolved itself at the end of 1918.

Throughout this time, starting in 1915, and on until 1922, Hartung was listed as a visiting professor at Halle. In 1922 he switched to Kiel, gaining a full professorship in early modern and modern history. However, just one year later he switched again, this time to Berlin where he took a professorship in modern history, economic history and constitutional history, taking over the teaching chair hitherto occupied by his old tutor, Otto Hintze. He was still at Berlin more than twenty years later when, finding itself now in the Soviet occupation zone, the Frederick William University was renamed, identified as the Humboldt University of Berlin. He served as university dean in 1945/46, and retired from the Berlin professorship in 1949.

Following the success of his pre-war constitutional history, 1920 saw the appearance of Hartung's book on modern German history between 1871 and 1919, which again became a standard work and was regularly revised, updated and reprinted till the 1960s. During the 1920s and 1930s further works on German history followed.

Régime change in 1933 was followed by a rapid transition to one-party dictatorship in Germany, Hartung was not one of those to oppose the abolition of parliamentary democracy, and there is no sign that in 1933 he foresaw Germany's future political direction of travel. He was one of many mainstream academics and professors who adapted themselves to the new political context without in any way becoming a cheer-leader for the toxic Nazi ideology. In 1937 Hartung may have been one of those conservative historians who agreed to join the party, possibly when he became an advisor to Walter Frank's Nazi Historical Institute ("Reichsinstitut für Geschichte des neuen Deutschlands"). He produced a couple of books covering topics over which the Nazis obsessed: "Volk" ("Volk und Staat in der deutschen Geschichte", 1940) and "Reich" ("Das Reich und Europa", 1941). Between 1941 and 1943 he also published three written volumes from the academic papers left by Otto Hintze, who had died in 1940.

War ended in May 1945 with what remained of Germany divided into military zones of occupation. The Humboldt University where Hartung continued to work found itself in the eastern part of Berlin, administered as part of the Soviet occupation zone. Hartung himself tried hard to avoid choosing between the two versions of Germany emerging during the late 1940s, but after 1949, when the military occupation zones gave way to two newly created German states, sponsored respectively by the United States and the Soviet Union, it became harder to believe that the division of the two version of Germany was a temporary phenomenon, and during the 1950s the political divisions were increasingly matched by physical divisions: it became ever more difficult for Berliners to move between the two "halves" of the city. In 1948 Hartung "chose" to live in West Berlin, a decision that drew comment, both adulatory and critical, from fellow historians. He was urged to transfer his academic base to the newly founded Free University of Berlin by Friedrich Meinecke among others, but did not do so. He resigned from his functions at the German Academy of Sciences (in East Berlin) only in 1953, and remained a member of the academy till 1967. Meanwhile, having by the end of his life lived and worked under five completely different political regimes in successive versions of Germany, he reacted to the apparent return of democracy in West Germany with what one commentator later interpreted as "cautious optimism".
