= Parteihochschule Karl Marx =

The Party Academy Karl Marx (Parteihochschule Karl Marx) was an academy (Hochschule) that was founded in 1946 in the Soviet occupation zone. During the German Democratic Republic (East Germany), it was subordinate to the Central Committee of the Socialist Unity Party. Teaching ceased on 30 June 1990.

== History ==
During the reign of the Socialist Unity Party, the Academy was the highest institution of Marxist-Leninist education, above the Bezirksparteischulen (regional party schools) and Kreisparteischulen (district party schools). The main alternative was studying at the Party Academy of the CPSU in Moscow.

Initially, the institution was subordinate to the Section for Agitation and Propaganda in the Central Committee of the Socialist Unity Party. From 1983 to 1990, the Secretary for Ideology and Culture was responsible.

During its existence, the academy offered studies and classes to more than 25,000 students. Among them were more than 1,200 students from socialist countries that had friendly ties with the GDR. Studies offered were Marxist-Leninist throughout. Numerous publications, both scientific and propagandist, were released. Members of the Socialist Unity Party and its organizations were delegated to studies of either one or three years duration, finishing as Diplom-Gesellschaftswissenschaftler (equivalent to a Bachelor in Social Sciences). Distance Studies were possible as well.

From 1946 to 1948, the institution's domicile was Liebenwalde near Oranienburg, then from 1948 to 1955 Castle Hakeburg (later guest house of the Socialist Unity Party). Notable teachers during these early years included Wolfgang Leonhard and Carola Stern. For 25 years from 1955 the academy was located in Berlin. Finally, from 1980 to 1990, it was dispersed across various institutes around Hakeburg again.

During the run-up to reunification the Academy was dissolved. The critical date was 30 June 1990 after which the institute's approximately 150 professors, teachers and teaching assistants, the remaining students and approximately 300 support workers were dispersed.

== Structure ==
=== Leadership ===
The principal of the Academy had the rank of a Central Committee Department head and was usually a full member of the Central Committee.

Period	Principal	
May 1946 — March 1947	Willi Kropp (Note: Co-department head in parity as former KPD member)	Carl Bose (Note: Co-department head in parity as former SPD member)
March 1947 — January 1949	Prof. Rudolf Lindau	Paul Lenzner
January 1949 — 12 September 1950	Prof. Rudolf Lindau	
12 September 1950 — 23 June 1983	Prof. Hanna Wolf	
23 June 1983 — 14 November 1989	Prof. Kurt Tiedke	
14 November 1989 — 30 June 1990	Prof. Dr. Götz Dieckmann	
