= Eduard Pfeiffer =

German banker and social reformer

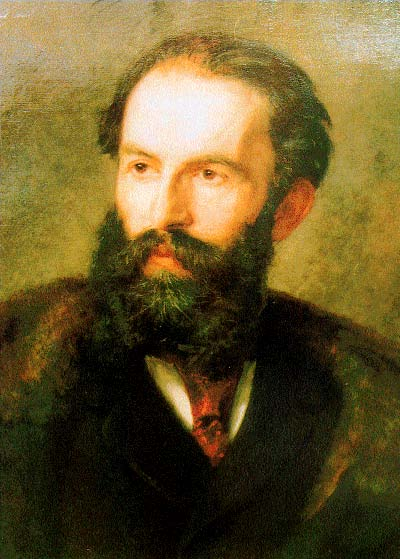
- Eduard Pfeiffer
- Born: Eduard Gotthilf Pfeiffer; 24 November 1835; Stuttgart, Württemberg
- Died: 13 May 1921; Stuttgart, Germany
- Occupations: Banker; Philanthropist; Pioneer of Social reform and of the co-operative movement
- Political party: German Party (Württemberg)
- Spouse: Julie Benary
- Parent(s): Marx Pfeiffer; Pauline Wittersheim

Eduard Gotthilf (von) Pfeiffer (24 November 1835 – 13 May 1921) was a German banker, social reformer, and pioneer of the co-operative movement.

== Life ==
=== Early years ===
Born in 1835, Eduard Pfeiffer was the thirteenth recorded child of Marx Pfeiffer, a top bank director, and one of the first Jewish citizens to have been granted the right to live in Stuttgart. Marx Pfeiffer's first two wives had died young, and Eduard's mother, born Pauline Wittersheim, was Marx's third wife.

One of Eduard's elder brothers was Ernst Ezechiel Pfeiffer, who would be remembered for his support of a number of charitable foundations in Cannstatt. Eduard Pfeiffer inherited considerable wealth and economic expertise, and used them to build an impressive entrepreneurial career of his own. In 1869 he was one of the founders of the "Württembergischen Vereinsbank" (roughly "Württemberg Associated Bank""), and was largely responsible for its growth during the generally economically benevolent decades of the German empire period. He was a member of the oversight boards of various leading businesses in the region and an influential member of the commercial establishment. He became one of the richest citizens in Württemberg.

=== Education and its application ===
On leaving school, in 1850 Pfeiffer went on to study Engineering and Commerce at the Polytechnic Academy in Stuttgart between 1850 and 1852, before moving on to study in France. Five years later he emerged from the École Centrale des Arts et Manufactures in Paris with a degree in chemical engineering. Between 1857 and 1862 he attended universities at Leipzig, Heidelberg and Berlin, studying Finance and Macro-economics. He also traveled extensively in and beyond France, Italy and Germany, also visiting England where in 1862 he visited the London World Fair. During his travels he began to familiarize himself with aspects of the socio-economic situation in Europe, and in England in 1862 he came across the Co-operative movement.

In 1862 Pfeiffer settled down in Stuttgart. Inherited wealth meant that he was financially secure, and for the next few years he was able to live and work as a freelance writer, producing during the 1860s books reflecting his acute observations and thoughts on the Co-operative movement.

=== Welfare and housing initiatives ===
It was at Pfeiffer's initiative that the Office for work registration was created in Stuttgart in 1865. It was the first non-commercial employment exchange in Germany and in that sense a forerunner of the modern national network of "Arbeitsaemter" ("labour offices"). In 1874 Pfeiffer set up a hostel for female factory workers, and in 1889 the workers' hostel in Stuttgart's Heusteigstraße ("Hay stack street"). In 1919/11 he sponsored the construction of a larger "singles' hostel" ("Ledigheim") to provide solutions for the grievances of lodgers and rough sleepers. Above all, however, his contribution in respect of low-costing housing is reflected in the four large residential estates (see below) which resulted from his sponsorship of a partial rebuilding project in inner Stuttgart's between 1906 and 1909.

Along with his numerous contributions to social housing, some of Pfeiffer's most important goals involved public health and sanitation. During the closing decades of the nineteenth century rapid industrialisation was accompanied by massive population transfers from the villages to the cities, which - not just in Stuttgart - led to urban overcrowding. Consequences included high infant mortality, poor hygiene in home and hospitals, and health issues resulting from poor food storage and handling. In 1910/12 Pfeiffer funded a desperately needed "Infants' Sanatorium". He was also among the founders of three public baths houses and two public libraries in Stuttgart. He organised the sale of safe milk for infants and the opening of a nursery, along with a children's playground.

Pfeiffer was politically active. On 7 August 1866, with a group of friends and acquaintances that included the Stuttgart industrialist Gustav Siegle, the banker Kilian von Steiner and the lawyer Julius Hölder, he founded the national liberal German Party (Württemberg), with the presciently timed objective of promoting a German state led by Prussia. Between 1868 and 1876 Pfeiffer was the first Jewish citizen with a seat in the second chamber of the Württemberg Landtag (assembly), something that till that time would have been forbidden by law.

=== Personal ===
In 1872 Pfeiffer married the young widow of a Parisian banker called Julie Benary. This made him richer than ever, and made possible the extent of his charitable activities. However, the marriage would be childless. In 1883 the king appointed him a privy councillor, which gave him a personal connection with the regional aristocracy. It also meant that, formally, the name "Pfeiffer" became "von Pfeiffer", although sources insist that he never attached much importance to this.

Pfeiffer saw his wealth not as an end in itself but as an obligation of service to the community. Because of the way in which he lived out his charitable convictions, and in particular in recognition of his financing, over three years, of a project that involved rebuilding a large part of the city's "old centre" between 1906 and 1909, he was made an Honorary Citizen of Stuttgart in 1909.

By the time Pfeiffer died, in the summer of 1921, most of the still substantial residuum of the couple's wealth had been used, in 1917, to establish the Eduard Pfeiffer foundation, which still exists.

== Eduard Pfeiffer and the consumer co-operative movement ==
Eduard Pfeiffer: published works (not necessarily a complete list)
- Pfeiffer, Eduard: Ueber Genossenschaftswesen – Was ist der Arbeiterstand in der heutigen Gesellschaft? Und was kann er werden? Leipzig: Wigand 1863.
- Pfeiffer, Eduard: Die Consumvereine, ihr Wesen und Wirken. Nebst einer practischen Anleitung zu deren Gründung und Einrichtung. Stuttgart: Kröner 2. Auflage 1865.
- Pfeiffer, Eduard: Eigenes Heim und billige Wohnungen. Ein Beitrag zur Lösung der Wohnungs-Frage mit besonderem Hinweis auf die Erstellung der Kolonie Ostheim-Stuttgart. Stuttgart: Wittwer 1896.

Eduard Pfeiffer can be seen as one of the first great prophets and pioneers of the consumer co-operative movement. His first book, which appeared in 1863, set out his thinking on the subject. Pfeiffer identified an urgent need for social reform, and saw a guided and targeted programme of self-help as providing an ideal route-map for it. His efforts in this respect remained consistent through his life: he worked to achieve steady improvements in working class living standards in order to bind people into a bourgeois social structure, and to distance them from Socialist and Communist ideas. Pfeiffer insisted that solutions for the social questions of the time could be found only through co-operation between the propertied and working classes. He pursued similar themes in his second book, which appeared in 1865, and in which he set out practical steps for the establishment and running of consumer co-operatives. Further publications on economic themes followed. He was also quick to put his ideas into practice, setting up in 1863 the Stuttgart Consumer and Savings Association, which became a model for most of the consumer co-operatives in Germany.

In 1867 Pfeiffer organised a conference in Stuttgart which would lead to the creation of the League of German Consumer Associations. The league was to be tasked with bulk purchasing of individual article for sale through co-operative associations across Germany. For most articles categories for shared purchasing should be created. In this way, Pfeiffer produced the structure for what became the national German Consumers' Association.

== Association for the welfare of the working classes ==
The Association for the welfare of the working classes ("der Verein für das Wohl der arbeitenden Klassen") was founded at Pfeiffer's instigation in 1866: between 1876 and 1921 he headed it. The Association was established to promote the interests, and to advance of the economic and moral condition of the working classes. Although the association had more than 100 influential and rich members, but the goals and activities were in large measure down to Pfeiffer himself who saw to most of the Association's work, through personal donations, gifts and other funding initiatives, involving his own contacts with entrepreneurs, banks, the royal court and the city authorities. Pfeiffer brought to the Association's range of activities his own ideas and theories, along with his personal experiences.

This Association provided a channel for Pfeiffer's thinking and experience in a singular combination that remains influential in Stuttgart and beyond. Most of the Association's projects have been integrated into Stuttgart's social and physical infrastructure. The most important of its socio-political, financial and organisational efforts took Pfeiffer and The Association into issues involving social housing for the rapidly growing city.

== Social housing ==
An extensive survey of housing conditions in Stuttgart, undertaken in 1887, disclosed shocking results in respect of the health and social conditions in much of the city's "old town" residential housing. In November 1890 the association, under Pfeiffer's leadership, decided on a project to create, in the language of the times, "cheap housing for little people". The project title indicates that the project target group extended beyond the city's industrial working-class, also including the less prosperous people from all classes, including craft workers and artisans. What resulted was, successively, four large-scale housing developments in different parts of Stuttgart:

- 1891–1901 Siedlung Ostheim (Ostheim estate): 1,300 apartments
- 1901–1904 Siedlung Südheim (Südheim estate): 140 apartments
- 1902–1904 Siedlung Westheim (Westheim estate): 100 apartments
- 1911–1913 Siedlung Ostenau(Ostenau estate): 260 apartments

These developments did not enable Pfeiffer, and other developers of the time, to solve every one of Stuttgart's housing problems, but they did take care of most of the issues. Priorities for the new accommodation included sufficiently large floor areas, domestic gardens and, subject to necessary costs constraints, plot sizes large enough to permit adequate light and air circulation. There was also a stress on practical floor plans and the avoidance of "prison cell" rooms. Frontages applied the neo-classical style of conventional middle class houses of the time, sometimes incorporating bay-windows, pediments and "half-timbered" features. Tenants were offered the chance to buy their apartments, paying by installment, which many eventually did, becoming members of the propertied classes as they did so.

The Ostheim, Südheim and Ostenau estates were all constructed under Pfeiffer's close supervision in collaboration with the Stuttgart architect Karl Hengerer, who produced the plans and took practical responsibility for the construction. Hengerer also planned and managed other projects for Pfeiffer, including the Infant Clinic and "Single's Hostel" (both in 1910/12) and the redevelopments in the Stuttgart "old centre" between 1906 and 1909.

== "Altstadt renovation" ==
Apart from the Ostheim development (above) Pfeiffer's most extensive project was the "Altstadt renovation", undertaken between 1906 and 1909, for which he received honorary citizenship of the city. Although sources refer to it as the "Altstadt-Sanierung" (literally "Old town renovation") it was not a renovation in the twenty-first century sense, but a large-scale tearing down and replacement of approximately 10% of the old city centre, using contemporary concepts and plans. The new buildings which replaced the old dilapidated structures were constructed in a fashionable style for urban residential and commercial use, not dissimilar in outward appearance to the late-renaissance frontages to be found in the heart of Innsbruck, Salzburg or Bozen (today, for English speakers, known as Bolzano). The elegant facades were combined with wider streets and a larger main square than hitherto. The result was somewhat romanticised when viewed by purists as a vision of the past, but it was nevertheless neat and homely when compared to the old more genuinely late medieval streetscapes it replaced, and it corresponded with the ideas (at this time) of the hugely influential (in southern Germany) architect and city-planner, Theodor Fischer.
