= Rudolf Tischner =

German ophthalmologist and parapsychologist

Rudolf Tischner (3 April 1879 in Hohenmölsen – 24 April 1961) was a German ophthalmologist and parapsychologist born in Hohenmölsen. After finishing his medical studies he practiced ophthalmology in Munich.

== Biography ==
He is remembered for his research in the field of parapsychology. He published numerous books and articles on topics such as telepathy, spiritualism, telekinesis, etc. He was inspired by the British Society for Psychical Research, and with philosopher Traugott Konstantin Oesterreich (1880-1949) tried to establish a similar institute in Germany. With Albert von Schrenck-Notzing (1862-1929), he fought for the recognition of parapsychology as a serious subject of study.

Among his most important contributions to the field of parapsychology were his experiments in clairvoyance, conducted at a time when most such research concerned telepathy. These experiments involved selected participants in identifying the targets – typically, text or drawings – concealed in opaque envelopes, while (unlike a telepathy experiment) no persons were aware of the contents of the envelope. Tischner's monograph Telepathie und Hellsehen (1921) collected his reports on these studies. In this work, Tischner referred to telepathy and clairvoyance as instances of a more general faculty of Außersinnlicher Wahrnehmung, thus, in its translation, coining the term extrasensory perception.

Tischner performed research on the possibilities of merging homeopathy with evidence-based medicine, and published a book on the evolution of homeopathy named "Das Werden der Homöopathie". He was the author of works on homeopath Samuel Hahnemann, titled "Samuel Hahnemann's Leben und Lehre" and "Die Bildwerke Hahnemanns und ihre Schöpfer". In the field of hypnosis he produced writings on the life and work of Franz Anton Mesmer, called "Franz Anton Mesmer, Leben, Werk und Wirkung" and "Mesmer und sein Problem, Magnetismus, Suggestion, Hypnose".

== Selected publications ==
- Das Werden der Homöopathie: Geschichte der Homöopathie vom Altertum bis zur neuesten Zeit, 9 editions published between 1950 and 2001 in German
- Einführung in den Okkultismus und Spiritismus (Introduction to Occultism and Spiritualism); J. F. Bergmann, München, 1923; 11 editions published between 1921 and 1923 in German
- Ergebnisse okkulter Forschung, eine Einführung in die Parapsychologie (Results of Occult Research, an Introduction to Parapsychology); Wissenschaftliche Buchgesellschaft, Darmstadt 1976; ISBN 3-534-06052-0; 26 editions published between 1950 and 1976 in 3 languages
- Fernfühlen und Mesmerismus (Exteriorisation der Sensibilität) 9 editions published in 1925 in German
- Franz Anton Mesmer; Leben, Werk und Wirkungen 11 editions published in 1928 in German and English
- Geschichte der homöopathie 16 editions published between 1932 and 2013 in 3 languages
- Geschichte der okkultistischen Forschung (History of Occult Research); Pfullingen, 1924
- Geschichte der Parapsychologie, Teil 2 (History of Parapsychology, Part 2); Pustet, Tittmoning, 1960
- Mesmer, Franz Anton, Über telepathie und hellsehen; experimentell theoretische untersuchungen 16 editions published between 1920 and 1921 in German
- Mesmer und sein Problem: Magnetismus, Suggestion, Hypnose 7 editions published in 1941 in German
- Monismus und Okkultismus (Monism and Occultism); O. Mutze, Leipzig 1921
- Telepathy and clairvoyance, 17 editions published between 1925 and 2013 in English
- Über Telepathie und Hellsehen, Experimentaltheoretische Untersuchungen; Bergmann (Regarding Telepathy, Experimental Theoretical Investigations); München, 1920
