= Rakowiska, Pomeranian Voivodeship =

Rakowiska
- Village
- Location within Poland
- Coordinates: 54°9′53″N 19°10′51″E
- Country: Poland
- Voivodeship: Pomeranian
- County: Nowy Dwór
- Gmina: Nowy Dwór Gdański
- Population: 270

Rakowiska ([rakɔˈviska]; German: Krebsfelde) is a village in the administrative district of Gmina Nowy Dwór Gdański, within Nowy Dwór County, Pomeranian Voivodeship, in northern Poland.
