= Ernst Engelberg =

German historian (1909–2010)

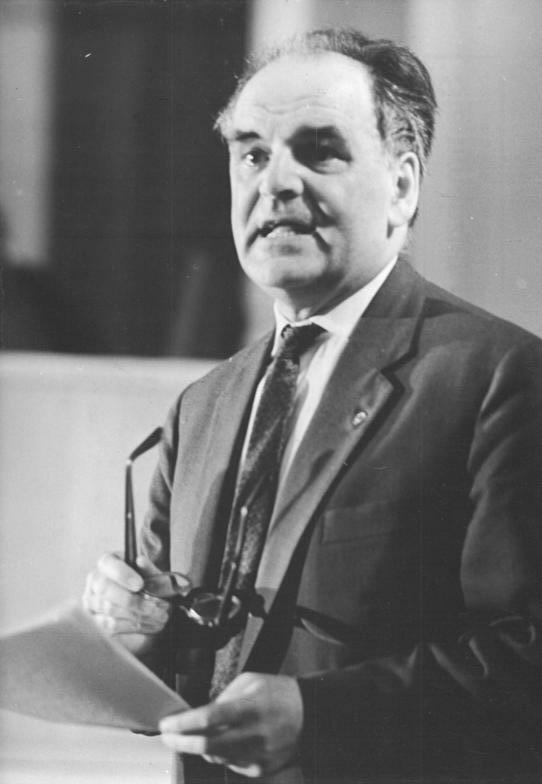
- Ernst Engelberg, was called to testify as an "expert witness" at the Globke Trial in 1963.
- Born: 5 April 1909; Haslach im Kinzigtal, Baden, Germany
- Died: 18 December 2010 (aged 101); Berlin, Germany
- Occupation: Historian
- Spouse: Waltraut Seifert (born Waltraut Duchatsch)
- Children: Achim Engelberg (writer); Renate Rauer (architect)

Ernst Engelberg (5 April 1909 – 18 December 2010) was a German university professor and Marxist historian.

He made a particularly noteworthy contribution with his two-volume biography of Otto von Bismarck which in the view of at least one commentator represented a paradigm shift for historiography in the German Democratic Republic.

== Life ==
=== Provenance ===
Ernst Engelberg was born into a family with well documented democratic revolutionary credentials. His grandfather Julius Engelberg (1829-1902) had taken to calling himself "von Engelberg" and joined a citizens' militia in the aftermath of 1848. Ernst Engelberg's father, Wilhelm Engelberg (1862-1947), was a publisher and a left-wing activist, who in 1898 had founded the local Social Democratic Party association in Haslach. The family was politically aware, and even as an old man Wilhelm Engelberg delighted to proclaim himself a "democrat of 1848" ("Ich bin 48er Demokrat").

=== Early years ===
Following a childhood that encouraged political questioning, and which was overshadowed by war, post-war political turmoil, and the economic disaster of the 1920s inflation, Engelberg found himself propelled towards the Young Communists, which he joined in 1928, and the Communist Party which he joined following his 21st birthday, two years later. His university studies took him between 1927 and 1934 to the University of Freiburg (briefly), the Ludwig-Maximilians-Universität München, and the Friedrich Wilhelm University of Berlin, where one of his tutors was Gustav Mayer. In addition to History, he studied Social Economics (Nationalökonomie), Philosophy and Jurisprudence. His doctoral dissertation was produced under the supervision of Hermann Oncken and, later, Fritz Hartung: it was concerned with Social Democracy in Germany and Chancellor Bismarck's social policy. By the time his dissertation was completed, however, in 1934, régime change had come to Germany, and his old history tutor, Gustav Mayer (who was Jewish), had been sacked from his university posts and persuaded to immigrate to (at this stage) the Netherlands. Ernst Engelberg's turned out to be one of very few doctorates awarded for a Marxist dissertation under the Third Reich.

Writing more than eight decades later, Engelberg's son commended the independence demonstrated by the Friedrich Wilhelm University of Berlin scholars awarding Ernst Engelberg his doctorate in defiance of the known political preferences of the ruling party. A few days after the traditional ceremony held on 22 February 1934 in which Engelberg orally defended his work before a committee of examiners Nemesis followed, however. In the evening of 26 February, he was arrested, and faced the régime's usual charge in such cases: Conspiracy to Commit High Treason. He faced trial, with others, on 17 October 1934 and was sentenced to an eighteen-month term, which he spent in the prison at Luckau. He later told his son that he had considered himself lucky: if the Nazis had known that Engelberg was the Communist Party student leader identified with the cover name "Alfred", his sentence would have been spent not in a prison but in a concentration camp.

=== Exile ===
On his release, in 1936 Engelberg fled to Switzerland. Here, following advice received from Gustav Mayer, he applied to and was accepted by the Graduate Institute of International and Development Studies in Geneva, from whom he now received a stipendium. He also became a member of the recently established Geneva branch of the Institute for Social Research, where fellow academic luminaries in exile included Hans Mayer, Hans Kelsen and Max Horkheimer. He had contacts with the Movement for a Free Germany.

In 1940, thanks to the contacts of Max Horkheimer he was able to immigrate to Turkey. Between 1940 and 1947 he worked as a lecturer at Istanbul University. He tried without success to obtain permission to immigrate to the United States or Cuba. The war ended in May 1945, but Engelberg, like many, encountered what sources term bureaucratic delays in attempting to return to what remained of Germany. In the end he succeeded in returning to Germany via Italy and Switzerland early in 1948, which was too late to renew his relationship with his father, Wilhelm Engelberg, who had died the previous year. The part of Germany to which he returned was in 1948 still administered as the Soviet occupation zone, which later, in October 1949, was relaunched as the German Democratic Republic, a new Soviet sponsored German state which was administratively configured according to Soviet precepts, and in which for the next forty years, Ernst Engelberg pursued a successful academic career. On arriving in 1948 he lost little time in joining the newly formed SED (party) which in due course became the ruling party of this new East German state.

=== The German Democratic Republic ===
In East Germany, Engelberg took a teaching post at the Teaching Academy ("Pädagogische Hochschule") in Potsdam (subsequently subsumed into the University of Potsdam). The next year, 1949, Ernst Engelberg was appointed Professor for the "History of the German Labour Movement" at Leipzig University, where colleagues included Hans Mayer (an old comrade from their time in Geneva), Ernst Bloch and Walter Markov, along with Werner Krauß, Wieland Herzfelde and Hermann Budzislawski. In 1951, he was appointed Director of Leipzig's newly established Institute for the History of the German People (" Institut für Geschichte des dt. Volkes"), a post he held till 1960. Research concentrated on the revolutionary Social Democracy Movement during the second half of the nineteenth century, and on the movement's leading figures such as August Bebel, Friedrich Engels and Julius Motteler. In 1953, he was provided with a full teaching contract by the university, where he was by now a member of the Party Leadership. He received his de:Lehrstuhl teaching chair in 1957. In addition, between March 1958 and March 1965 Ernst Engelberg served as President of the newly established (East) German Historical Society.

Further appointments at the vital interface between the academic and political worlds followed. In 1960 the (East) German Academy of Sciences appointed him as Director of its Institute for German History in succession to Karl Obermann. From 1969 till his retirement in 1974 he headed up the restructuring of the Academy's so-called "Research Centre for Methodology and then History of History Sciences" ("Forschungsstelle für Methodologie und Geschichte der Geschichtswissenschaft"). During this time he developed and promulgated his "Education Theory" ("Formationstheorie"). Between 1960 and 1980 Ernst Engelberg served as President of the National Committee of East German Historians ("Nationalkomitee der Historiker der DDR").

By the time reunification came, Engelberg was more than 80 years old. He nevertheless lived on for more than another two decades, spending his final years living in Berlin with his second wife, Waltraut. When the old East German ruling SED mutated into the Party of Democratic Socialism (PDS) he signed his membership across to the new party, joining its Council of Elders ("Ältestenrat").

Ernst Engelberg (1909-2010): publications (not a complete list)

- Revolutionäre Politik und rote Feldpost 1878–1890. Akademie-Verlag, Berlin 1959.
- Deutschland von 1849 bis 1871. Berlin 1965.
- Deutschland von 1871 bis 1897. Berlin 1965.
- Theorie, Empirie und Methode in der Geschichtswissenschaft. Gesammelte Aufsätze, Berlin 1980.
- Bismarck. Urpreuße und Reichsgründer. Berlin 1985.
- Bismarck. Das Reich in der Mitte Europas. Berlin 1990.
- Die Deutschen – woher wir kommen. (Hrsg. von Achim Engelberg), Dietz-Verlag, Berlin 2009, ISBN 978-3-320-02170-2.
- Die Bismarcks. Eine preußische Familiensaga vom Mittelalter bis heute. (zusammen mit Achim Engelberg), Siedler, München 2010, ISBN 978-3-88680-971-4.
- Wie bewegt sich, was uns bewegt? Evolution und Revolution in der Weltgeschichte. Herausgegeben, bearbeitet und ergänzt von Achim Engelberg. Mit einer Einführung von Peter Brandt. Franz Steiner Verlag, Stuttgart 2013, ISBN 978-3-515-10270-4.
- Bismarck. Sturm über Europa. Herausgegeben und bearbeitet von Achim Engelberg, Siedler, München 2014, ISBN 9783827500243

== Publications ==
The list of Ernst Engelberg's publications is a long one.

Unusually, his two-volume biography of Otto von Bismarck appeared simultaneously in East Germany and West Germany, attracting attention and comment on both sides of the border.

Engelberg was impressed by Bismarck's political realism, his intellectual insights and imagination, the care with which he calibrated his foreign policy, and his willingness to recognise the emergence of the new age. But the chancellor remained a stranger the world of industry and the working class.

The volumes appeared separately in 1985 and 1990. Rudolf von Augstein himself contributed a thoughtful review of each, in Der Spiegel commending and respecting many of the biographer's insights, despite von Augstein's predicable and necessary caution over Engleberg's underlying Marxist contextualising.

== Awards and honours ==
- 1964 National Prize of East Germany Class III
- 1974 Patriotic Order of Merit in gold
- 1979 Order of Karl Marx
- 1984 National Prize of East Germany Class I

In October 1989 Ernst Engelberg became the last recipient of the Outstanding People's Scholar ("Hervorragender Wissenschaftler des Volkes").
