= Arbeit - Bewegung - Geschichte =

Scientific journal

Arbeit - Bewegung - Geschichte: Zeitschrift für historische Studien
- Discipline: labour history
- Language: German
- Edited by: Riccardo Altieri, Eric Angermann, Fabian Bennewitz, Vera Bianchi, Sarah Binz, Holger Czitrich-Stahl, Oliver Gaida, Minas Hilbig, Ralf Hoffrogge, Bernd Hüttner, Leonie Karwath, Dietmar Lange, Sarah Langwald, Robert Schmieder, Anja Thuns, Axel Weipert

Publication details
- History: 2002-present
- Publisher: Metropol Verlag (Germany)
- Frequency: Triannually

Standard abbreviations
- ISO 4: Arb. Beweg. Gesch.

Indexing
- ISSN: 2366-2387
- OCLC no.: 49930935

Links
- Journal homepage; Online tables of content

Arbeit - Bewegung - Geschichte ("Labour - Movement - History") is an academic journal covering the history of labour and other social movements. It was established in 2002 as Jahrbuch für Forschungen zur Geschichte der Arbeiterbewegung ("Yearbook on Labour History") and renamed in 2016.

Each issue has a main section of historical essays dealing with a variety of subjects such as the history of women's liberation, social movements in general or the antifascist resistance movements in Germany and Europe. Its main focus nevertheless is the history of the international labour and union movements, including organizations such as the Comintern and its member parties as well as social-democratic parties.
