= Mario Keßler =

German historian (born 1955)

Mario Keßler (born 4 May 1955) is a German historian.

== Biography ==
Keßler was born on 4 May 1955, in Jena. He attended school in Jena between 1962 and 1974 and then, between 1974 and 1979, studied History and Germanistics in Jena and Leipzig. His doctorate, also from Leipzig, followed in 1982. His dissertation topic was "The Comintern and the Arabic East 1919-1929". Between 1982 and 1987, he held a position in the Africa and Middle East department at the University of Leipzig. In 1987 he moved to Berlin, taking up an academic research position. His habilitation, this time from the German Academy of Sciences at Berlin, followed in 1990. This time his dissertation dealt with "Socialism and Zionism: the international labour movement and political Zionism 1897-1933". Work on the habilitation involved lengthy study visits to Moscow and Warsaw.

Keßler has held an extraordinary professorship at the University of Potsdam, where he was also a member of the Centre for Contemporary History, since 2005. After his retirement on March 1, 2021 he was appointed Senior Fellow at the Centre.

Since 1991, Keßler has spent periods of teaching as a guest professor at various international universities including the City College of New York, Columbus State University (Georgia), the Hebrew University of Jerusalem, Sciences Po, Rutgers University, the University of Massachusetts Amherst and Yeshiva University. Keßler was an invited researcher at German Historical Institute, Harvard University, Johns Hopkins University, King's College London and the University of Minnesota.

Keßler's particular professional interests include Zionism, antisemitism and the German labour movement, with a particular interest on research of communist movements in the twentieth century. He is now preparing a biography of Paul Merker, an East German politician who excited the mistrust of Walter Ulbricht in the 1950s and became a victim of Stalinist persecution. In 2011, Keßler was a co-signatory of an open letter organised by Wolfgang Weber, addressed to the publisher Ulla Berkéwicz at Suhrkamp Verlag. The signatories urged against the publication of a German translation of a Trotsky biography by the English historian Robert Service. The book by Service had already been available in English for nearly two years and the German scholars, expressing their shared view forcefully, endorsed the critical assessment of the socialist historian David North. They complained of factual inaccuracies, misrepresentation of sources and failure to meet normal academic standards. There was also a strong sense that Stalin's twenty-year campaign to discredit his political rival had been swallowed uncritically by Service. Suhrkamp Publishing House nevertheless printed the German version of the book.

Keßler is member of the international advisory boards of the International Conference of Labour and Social History, the International Rosa Luxemburg Society and of Arbeit - Bewegung - Geschichte. He is also a member of the Historical Commission of The Left Party (Die Linke).

== Selected Works ==
- Antisemitismus, Zionismus und Sozialismus. Arbeiterbewegung und jüdische Frage im 20. Jahrhundert Decaton-Verlag, Mainz 1993, ISBN 3-929455-00-5 (2. Auflage. ebenda 1994).
- Zionismus und internationale Arbeiterbewegung. 1897–1933. Vorwort von Theodor Bergmann. Akademie-Verlag, Berlin 1994, ISBN 3-05-002047-4 (Zugleich: Berlin, Akademie der Wissenschaften der DDR, Dissertation, 1990: Sozialismus und Zionismus.).
- Die SED und die Juden – zwischen Repression und Toleranz. Politische Entwicklungen bis 1967 (= Zeithistorische Studien. Bd. 6). Akademie-Verlag, Berlin 1995, ISBN 3-05-003007-0.
- Heroische Illusion und Stalin-Terror. Beiträge zur Kommunismus-Forschung. VSA-Verlag, Hamburg 1999, ISBN 3-87975-745-3.
- Exilerfahrung in Wissenschaft und Politik. Remigrierte Historiker in der frühen DDR (= Zeithistorische Studien. Bd. 18). Vorwort von Georg G. Iggers. Böhlau, Köln u. a. 2001, ISBN 3-412-14300-6.
- Exil und Nach-Exil. Vertriebene Intellektuelle im 20. Jahrhundert. VSA-Verlag, Hamburg 2002, ISBN 3-87975-877-8.
- Arthur Rosenberg. Ein Historiker im Zeitalter der Katastrophen (1889–1943) (= Zeithistorische Studien. Bd. 24). Vorwort von Theodor Bergmann. Böhlau, Köln u. a. 2003, ISBN 3-412-04503-9.
- Ein Funken Hoffnung. Verwicklungen: Antisemitismus, Nahost, Stalinismus. VSA-Verlag, Hamburg 2004, ISBN 3-89965-099-9.
- Vom bürgerlichen Zeitalter zur Globalisierung. Beiträge zur Geschichte der Arbeiterbewegung (= Reihe Hochschulschriften. Bd. 8). trafo, Berlin 2005, ISBN 3-89626-279-3.
- On Anti-Semitism and Socialism. Selected Essays (= Reihe Hochschulschriften. Bd. 9). trafo, Berlin 2005, ISBN 3-89626-284-X.
- Ossip K. Flechtheim. Politischer Wissenschaftler und Zukunftsdenker (1909–1998) (= Zeithistorische Studien. Bd. 41). Böhlau, Köln u. a. 2007, ISBN 978-3-412-14206-3.
- Von Hippokrates zu Hitler. Über Kommunismus, Faschismus und die Totalitarismus-Debatte (= Reihe Hochschulschriften. Bd. 20). trafo, Berlin 2008, ISBN 978-3-89626-795-5.
- Historia magistra vitae? Über Geschichtswissenschaft und politische Bildung (= Reihe Hochschulschriften. Bd. 34). trafo, Berlin 2010, ISBN 978-3-89626-646-0.
- Kommunismuskritik im westlichen Nachkriegsdeutschland. Franz Borkenau – Richard Löwenthal – Ossip Flechtheim. vbb – Verlag für Berlin-Brandenburg Berlin 2011, ISBN 978-3-942476-15-7.
- with Werner Berthold: Klios Jünger. 100 Historiker von Homer bis Hobsbawm. Akademische Verlagsanstalt, Leipzig 2011, ISBN 978-3-931982-72-0.
- Sektierer, Lernender und Märtyrer. Arkadij Maslow (1891–1941). Pankower Vorträge 176, Helle Panke, Berlin 2013.
- Arbeiteremanzipation und Antisemitismus. Drei Studien. Pankower Vorträge 178, Helle Panke, Berlin 2013.
- Ruth Fischer. Ein Leben mit und gegen Kommunisten (1895–1961) (= Zeithistorische Studien. Bd. 51). Böhlau, Köln u. a. 2013, ISBN 978-3-412-21014-4.
- Communism – For and Against. The Political Itineraries of Ruth Fischer (1895–1961) (= BzG – Kleine Reihe Biographien. Bd. 27). trafo, Berlin 2013, ISBN 978-3-86464-035-3.
- Moses Hess and Ferdinand Lassalle. Pioneers of Social Emancipation (= BzG – Kleine Reihe Biographien. Bd. 28). trafo, Berlin 2013, ISBN 978-3-86464-044-5.
- Albert Schreiner. Kommunist mit Lebensbrüchen. * 7.8.1892, Aglasterhausen, † 4.8.1979, Berlin-Ost (= BzG – Kleine Reihe Biographien. Bd. 29). trafo, Berlin 2014, ISBN 978-3-86464-058-2.
- Grenzgänger des Kommunismus. Zwölf Porträts aus dem Jahrhundert der Katastrophen. Karl Dietz, Berlin 2015, ISBN 978-3-320-02312-6.
- as co-editor with Wladislaw Hedeler: Reformen und Reformer im Kommunismus. Für Theodor Bergmann. Eine Würdigung. VSA-Verlag, Hamburg 2015, ISBN 978-3-89965-635-0 (Onlinezugang Archived 2016-05-14 at the Wayback Machine).
- Revolution und Konterrevolution. Studien über Gewalt und Humanität aus dem Jahrhundert der Katastrophen, Berlin 2016, ISBN 978-3-86464-081-0.
- Alfred Meusel: Soziologe und Historiker zwischen Bürgertum und Marxismus (1896–1960), Dietz Verlag, Berlin 2016, ISBN 978-3-32002-330-0.
- Leo Trotzki über Antisemitismus und Faschismus. Pankower Vorträge 208, Helle Panke, Berlin 2017.
- Westemigranten. Deutsche Kommunisten zwischen USA-Exil und DDR (= Zeithistorische Studien. Bd. 60). Böhlau, Wien u. a. 2019, ISBN 978-3-412-50044-3.
- Between "History and Futurology": Ossip K. Flechtheim (1909–1998). trafo, Berlin 2019 (= BzG – Kleine Reihe Biographien, Bd. 17), ISBN 978-3-86464-190-9.
- "... von gewissen Schwankungen nicht ganz frei..." Josef Winternitz: Ein Leben zwischen Oxford, Prag, Berlin und London (1896-1952). trafo Berlin 2019 (= BzG – Kleine Reihe Biographien, Bd. 40), ISBN 978-3-86464-203-6.
- A Political Biography of Arkadij Maslow, 1891–1941: Dissident Against His Will. Palgrave Macmillan, New York 2020, ISBN 978-3-030-43256-0.
- Für unsere und eure Freiheit. Der Kongress der Ostvölker in Baku nach 100 Jahren, in: Internationales Willi Münzenberg Forum, 14. August 2020.
- Abgründe und Aufbrüche. Neue Studien und Kritiken (2014-2019). trafo, Berlin 2020, ISBN 9783864640612.
- as co-editor with Frank Jacob: Transatlantic Radicalism. Socialist and Anarchist Exchanges in the 19th and 20th Centuries. Liverpool University Press, Liverpool 2021 (= Studies in Labour History 16), ISBN 9781800859609.
- as editor: Arthur Rosenberg, Entstehung und Geschichte der Weimarer Republik. Europäische Verlagsanstalt, Hamburg 2021, ISBN 978-3-86393-101-8.
- as editor: Leo Trotzki oder: Sozialismus gegen Antisemitismus. Dietz, Berlin 2022, ISBN 978-3-320-02395-9.
- Für unsere und eure Freiheit. Beiträge zur angewandten Aufklärung (2017-2021). trafo, Berlin 2022, ISBN 978-3-86464-131-2.
- Sozialisten gegen Antisemitismus: Zur Judenfeindschaft und ihrer Bekämpfung (1844–1939). VSA Verlag, Hamburg 2022, ISBN 978-3-96488-144-1.
- Flucht in Ketten, Sehnsucht hinter Mauern. Essays zur Geschichte, Politik und Kultur (2020-2024). trafo, Berlin 2024, ISBN 978-3-86464-264-7.
