= Lothar Mertens =

German historian

Lothar Mertens (2 January 1959 – 4 December 2006) was a prolific German historian and social sciences scholar. A principal focus of his output was on the German Democratic Republic (East Germany, 1949–1990).

== Life and work ==
Lothat Mertens was born in Leverkusen in West Germany at the height of the country's remarkable postwar economic revival. He studied History, Catholic Theology and Sociology at the universities of Bochum and Cologne. He received his doctorate in 1990 for a piece of work on the development of Women's Studies in Germany as a branch of social sciences before 1945. A higher level doctorate from the University of Potsdam followed in 1996, received for a study of the life and works of the peace and human rights activist, Kurt Grossmann.

He also received his habilitation (higher academic qualification) in 1996. This came from Bochum University. This time his dissertation was entitled "The Star of David under Hammer and Compass - The Jewish Community in the Soviet occupation zone / German Democratic Republic and their Treatment by the Party and the State 1945–1990". After this he worked as a private tutor at Bochum. He also embarked on a project, jointly with Wilhelm Bleek, concerning the way in which dissertations had been produced and used in the German Democratic Republic during the four decades before its re-integration into what had become the German Federal Republic. Their work involved studying the output of East German historians and of the (East) German Academy of Sciences and Humanities. Their published conclusions were very critical of academic work produced in East Germany. Mertens was seen to endorse the view put forward by Arnulf Baring that much of East German scholarship was literally useless ("auf weite Strecken unbrauchbar").

As an author Mertens was formidably prolific. He died young, by which time the German National Library listed 24 books which he had produced as author (15) or co-author/compiler/producer (9). Alongside the history of the German Democratic Republic and German academic education, he also concerned himself with the history of education more generally, with the history of Jewish communities in Germany during the twentieth century, and with the relations between the states of Germany and Israel.

Lothar Mertens died suddenly in Berlin on 4 December 2006.

== Controversy ==
Mertens' work on the academic history of the German Democratic Republic drew strong criticism, notably from former East German academics. His work was attacked as "corrupted" and his conclusions as all too often one sided. Mario Keßler identified in his output the same absence of the necessary self-critical reflection which Mertens had found lacking in East German historical scholarship.

Mertens' description of East German academic researchers as the "Red cadre" ("rote Kader") and of the Social Sciences Society as the party central committee's "Red thought factory" ("rote Denkfabrik") also attracted adverse comment. Eberhard Fromm objected that Mertens had characterised almost everyone who worked at the Society as interchangeable "like so many light bulbs in a string of Christmas lights".

== Personal ==
Lothat Mertens was married to fellow academic Esther Jonas-Märtin.
