= Gunter Rettner =

German politician (1942–1998)

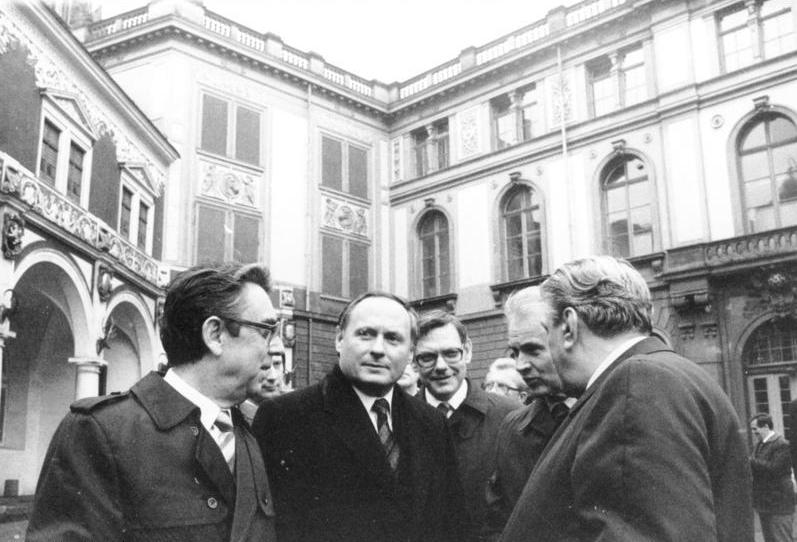
- Rettner (centre) between Oskar Lafontaine and Hans Modrow in 1985

Head of the Department for International Politics and Economics of the Central Committee
- In office 28 October 1985 – 3 December 1989
- Secretary: Hermann Axen; Günter Sieber
- Deputy: Karl Wildberger; Hans-Georg Schuster; Harry Morgenstern
- Preceded by: Herbert Häber
- Succeeded by: Position abolished

Personal details
- Born: Gunter Rettner; 28 January 1942 Zeitz, Province of Saxony, Free State of Prussia, Nazi Germany (now Saxony-Anhalt, Germany)
- Died: 11 December 1998 (aged 56) Finowfurt, Brandenburg, Germany
- Party: Socialist Unity Party (1963–1989)
- Education: Central Komsomol School; CPSU Higher Party School "W. I. Lenin" (Dipl.-Ges.-Wiss.)
- Occupation: Politician; Party Functionary; Bricklayer
- Awards: Patriotic Order of Merit, 2nd class
- Central institution membership: 1988–1989: Full member, Central Committee; 1986–1988: Candidate member, Central Committee; Other offices held: 1989: Head, Trafficking Department of the Central Committee; 1983–1985: Deputy Head, West Department of the Central Committee

Gunter Rettner (28 January 1942 – 11 December 1998) was a German politician and functionary of the Free German Youth (FDJ) and the Socialist Unity Party (SED).

In the German Democratic Republic, during the 1980s, a period of German-German rapprochement, he served as head of the powerful Department for International Politics and Economics (previously known as West Department) of the SED Central Committee. In this role, he held contacts with many West German politicians.

== Life and career ==
=== Early career ===
The son of an industrial clerk and a seamstress, Rettner completed an apprenticeship as a bricklayer in Zeitz and Gera after attending primary and secondary school, and then worked in that profession for some time. At the beginning of his apprenticeship, he joined the FDJ (Free German Youth) in 1956, served as Secretary of the FDJ in Gera from 1962 to 1964 and became a member of the ruling SED (Socialist Unity Party) in 1963.

From 1964 to 1965, he studied at the Central Komsomol School in Moscow and, upon his return, served as Secretary for Agitation and Propaganda of the Bezirk Gera FDJ until 1968. During this period, he also had contacts with representatives of the Socialist Youth of Germany – The Falcons, a youth organisation of the Social Democratic Party. Subsequently, he was initially the deputy head of the Central Working Group (ZAG) in the Central Council of the FDJ and then studied at the CPSU Higher Party School "W. I. Lenin" in Moscow from 1971 to 1974, graduating with a diploma in social sciences (Dipl.-Ges.-Wiss.).

Upon his return to the GDR, he first served as head of the ZAG Department in the Central Council of the FDJ until 1975, and then from 1975 to 1983, he was Secretary of the Central Council for Western Affairs and a member of the Bureau of the Central Council of the FDJ, thus being part of the highest leadership body of the youth organization of the SED and one of the closest collaborators of the then First Secretary of the Central Council, Egon Krenz. In 1975, he was also appointed as a representative of the FDJ to the Presidium of the Peace Council of the GDR.

After leaving the FDJ, he became deputy head of the West Department of the SED Central Committee in 1983, which was renamed the Department for International Politics and Economics (IPW) in 1984.

=== West Department Head ===
In 1985, department head Herbert Häber became a victim of an intrigue directed against him and his political objectives. He was isolated, bullied and removed and ultimately institutionalized in August 1985, as a scapegoat for the worsening relationship with the Soviet Union. Rettner succeeded Häber as department head in October 1985.

Having been elected as a candidate member in April 1986 (XI. Party Congress), Rettner rose to become a full member of the Central Committee of the SED in December 1988, serving until its collective resignation in December 1989. In 1989, he briefly also served as head of the clandestine Central Committee Trafficking Department, responsible for courier services and secret financing of the West German Communist Party, succeeding Julius Cebulla.

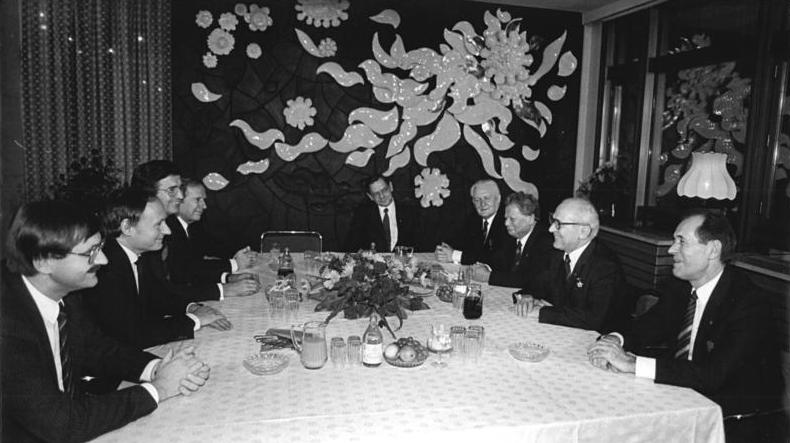
Rettner (centre) at a meeting with between Oskar Lafontaine and First Mayor of Hamburg Klaus von Dohnanyi with Erich Honecker in October 1987

As head of the Department for International Politics and Economics, he had significant contacts with West German, SEW (Socialist Unity Party of West Berlin) and leading SPD (Social Democratic Party of Germany) politicians such as Jusos chairman Gerhard Schröder, Anke Fuchs, Peter Glotz and particularly Minister-President of the Saarland Oskar Lafontaine, including from the Berlin state association. In 1984, he was initially an "observer" and then in 1988, even a "guest" at the SPD Berlin state party conventions. Regular discussions were also held with CDU (Christian Democratic Union) and CSU (Christian Social Union) politicians.

As the head of the Central Committee department responsible for Western policy, he wrote a report to SED General Secretary Erich Honecker in March 1987 about a meeting with Harry Ristock, a longstanding figure in the Berlin SPD. The two had met in West Berlin to prepare for the annual round of talks between representatives of the SED Central Committee and the leadership of the Berlin SPD. However, Ristock first described the discussion within the SPD party board regarding the recently lost Bundestag election. The focus now was on quickly "opening the party to possible coalition partners outside the CDU/CSU and winning the majority with Oskar Lafontaine in 1991." Oskar Lafontaine was the favorite of Willy Brandt and, in a sense, also "a grandson of Erich Honecker" as a "double-grandson." The two got along excellently, and "it would be a blessing for both parties and states if Erich Honecker remained General Secretary for a long time and Oskar Lafontaine became the new party chairman."

In the fall of 1987, a meeting took place with another senior SPD politician, Karsten Voigt, a member of the Bundestag and the party's foreign policy spokesman. Voigt handed Rettner copies of NATO analyses and position papers—before they were finalized and approved by the North Atlantic Assembly (now: NATO Parliamentary Assembly). This is documented in an internal SED protocol from 27 October 1987. Proud of his exclusive acquisition, Rettner sent Voigt's documents with "socialist greetings" to Politburo member Egon Krenz. The tables of contents of the documents reveal what Voigt must have handed to Comrade Rettner. The "Draft Report" from the subcommittee "Conventional Defense – New Strategies and Operational Concepts," written in September 1987, describes among other things the "concepts of air and ground warfare," the "modernization program" for chemical weapons, and the "nuclear threshold" in the defense strategy "Follow-on-Forces-Attack," or FOFA for short.

When Oskar Lafontaine protested in late November 1987 against the search and arrest of seven employees of the Environmental Library of the Zion Church (Berlin) by the Ministry for State Security, Honecker feared a "change in direction" from Lafontaine. Consequently, Rettner visited Lafontaine at the Saarbrücken State Chancellery and directly addressed the issue in their conversation. He rejected any "interference in internal affairs," described the detainees as "people who acted against the laws of the GDR," and advocated "a realistic approach to normalizing relations between the two German states." Then followed the crucial sentence: "On the other hand, Lafontaine also benefited from the fact that relations between the GDR and Saarland are particularly good." In the protocol that Rettner prepared for the Politburo afterward, it was noted that Lafontaine "was visibly affected" and responded that it had "never been his intention" to "discredit Erich Honecker's policies," and that he had made his statement "primarily from an internal political perspective." Lafontaine then added that he had "deep trust" in the SED General Secretary.

In April 1988, Rettner, along with Egon Krenz, then Secretary of the Central Committee of the SED for Security Affairs, Youth and Sport, participated in a meeting with Hans Otto Bräutigam, the Head of the Permanent Representation of West Germany to the GDR, concerning youth and sports exchanges between the West Germany and the GDR.

In 1977, Rettner was awarded the Patriotic Order of Merit in bronze and in 1983 in silver.

=== Peaceful Revolution ===
On 1 October 1989, he received a letter from Dietmar Ahrens, then SEW Chairman, reporting on a conversation between Berlin's Governing Mayor Walter Momper and Valentin Falin, Head of the International Department of the CPSU Central Committee. Momper expressed rumors about a mass border breach in the GDR in connection with the 40th anniversary of the GDR.

Due to his close connections with Krenz, Rettner was considered by Krenz for a membership in the Politburo of the SED as part of a "rejuvenation" in October 1989, alongside Wolfgang Herger, Günther Jahn, Hartmut König, Helga Labs, Hans Modrow, Erich Postler, Wilfried Poßner, Hans-Joachim Willerding and Eberhard Aurich.

In mid-November 1989, Rettner met with CDU Federal Treasurer Walther Leisler Kiep to prepare a meeting with the Chief of the Federal Chancellery, Rudolf Seiters. A conversation protocol from 16 November 1989, confirms that the Kohl government, even under Krenz, was committed to the continued existence of the SED state. Bonn was prepared to support the struggling comrades with extensive aid measures. In a four-hour conversation on 15 November 1989, at the East Berlin Palace Hotel, Rettner and Kiep prepared a visit from Chancellery Chief Seiters.

=== Reunified Germany ===
In 1990, Rettner, alongside Hartmut König, another former Secretary of the Central Council of the FDJ, worked on Egon Krenz's book "When Walls Fall. The Peaceful Revolution. Background – Course – Impact."

Later, he, along with Klaus Eichler and Frank Bochow, also former FDJ officials, became a partner in Touristik-Union-Kontakt International GmbH (TUK), a company whose assets came from the SED.

Rettner passed away in Finowfurt in 1998 at the age of 56.
