= Herbert Häber =

German politician (1930–2020)

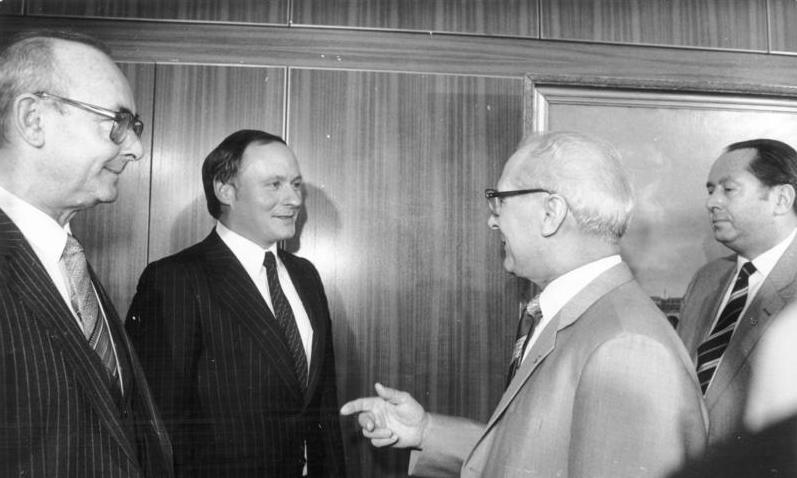
- Häber (right) with Erich Honecker and Oskar Lafontaine in 1982

Secretary for International Politics and Economics of the Central Committee Secretariat
- In office 24 May 1984 – 22 November 1985
- General Secretary: Erich Honecker
- Preceded by: Paul Verner
- Succeeded by: Hermann Axen

Head of the Department for International Politics and Economics of the Central Committee (Note: West Department until May 1984)
- In office 14 December 1973 – 28 October 1985
- Secretary: Albert Norden; Paul Verner; himself
- Deputy: Karl Wildberger; Günter Pötschke; Gunter Rettner
- Preceded by: Heinz Geggel
- Succeeded by: Gunter Rettner

Personal details
- Born: Herbert Häber; 15 November 1930 Zwickau, Free State of Saxony, Weimar Republic (now Germany)
- Died: 10 April 2020 (aged 89) Berlin, Germany
- Party: Socialist Unity Party (1946–1989)
- Education: CPSU Higher Party School "W. I. Lenin"
- Occupation: Politician; Party Functionary; Journalist
- Awards: Patriotic Order of Merit, 1st class; Banner of Labor
- Central institution membership: 1984–1985: Full member, Politburo of the Central Committee; 1978–1986: Full member, Central Committee; 1976–1978: Candidate member, Central Committee; Other offices held: 1971–1973: Director, IPW; 1965–1971: Deputy State Secretary, State Secretariat for West German Affairs; 1965: Deputy Head, West Department of the Central Committee

Herbert Häber (15 November 1930 – 10 April 2020) was a German politician and high-ranking party functionary of the Socialist Unity Party (SED).

Häber was one of the most influential foreign policy experts in the GDR, serving as the longtime head of the West Department at the Central Committee of the SED. In this role, he held contacts with many West German politicians.

Häber supported SED leader Erich Honecker's policy of German-German dialogue and rapprochement, leading to his surprising ascension to the SED Politburo in May 1984. Häber was however removed and institutionalized in August 1985, as a scapegoat for the worsening relationship with the Soviet Union.

== Life and career ==
=== Early career ===
Herbert Häber was born in 1930 in Zwickau, Saxony, into a working-class family. In 1945, Häber worked as a laborer in the Zwickau metalworks.

In 1946, he joined the Free German Youth (FDJ) and the ruling Socialist Unity Party (SED). From 1947 to 1949, he was a member of the FDJ district association and the SED district leadership in Zwickau, as well as a correspondent for the Soviet News Agency and the state news agency Allgemeiner Deutscher Nachrichtendienst. In 1949, he completed his studies at the state party school and subsequently became a party instructor and sector leader in the Press and Broadcasting Department of the SED Central Committee.

In 1951, at the age of 20, Häber moved to Berlin. Until the end of 1952, he worked as a political employee of the West Commission at the SED Politburo, and in early 1953, he assumed the leadership of the sector for all-German issues in the Press and Broadcasting Department of the SED Central Committee.

From 1954 to 1955, he studied at the CPSU Higher Party School "W. I. Lenin" in Moscow. Afterward, he served as a sector leader until 1960 and, until 1965, as the head of the West Commission, a full-time employee of the Politburo of the Central Committee of the SED.

=== State Secretariat for West German Affairs ===
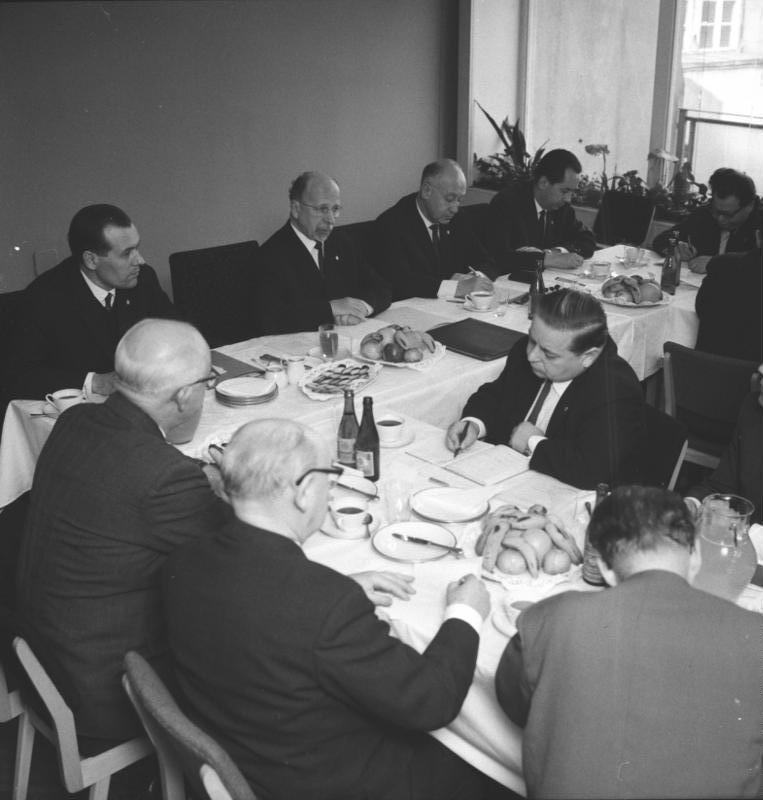
Häber (upper-right corner) at a meeting of the Council for All-German Issues in February 1966

From June to November 1965, he briefly was the deputy head of the West Department of the Central Committee of the SED before being appointed the deputy state secretary for West German Affairs under Joachim Herrmann in December. The State Secretariat's task was to influence West German public opinion towards the SED's goal of a reunified Germany under their rule.

During this time, Häber was the one who took on the risk of writing the ultimately successful 1971 letter to Soviet leader Brezhnev requesting Walter Ulbricht's dismissal as SED leader.

The State Secretariat for West German Affairs was abolished in July 1971 as part of the SED's broader shift away from reunification. Häber subsequently served as the director of the newly established Institute for International Politics and Economics (IPW), meant to research supposed imperialism in West Germany.

=== SED Central Committee ===
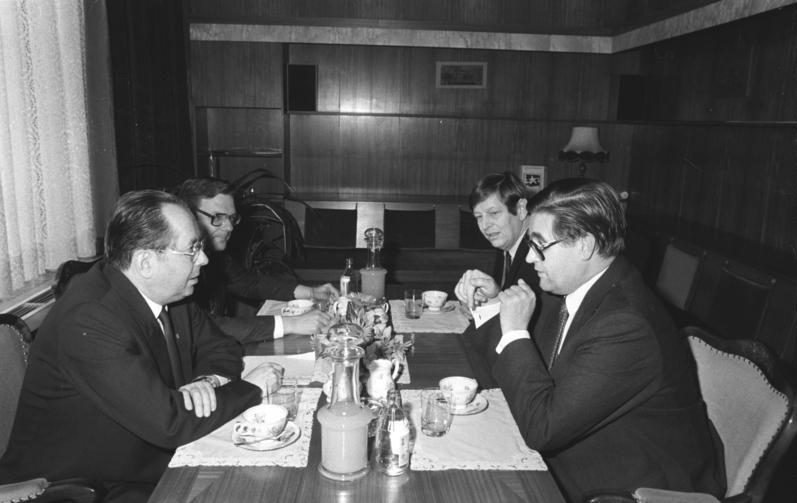
Häber (left) meeting Mayor of Bremen Hans Koschnick (right) in March 1985

In December 1973, he was made head of the West Department, later renamed the Department of International Politics and Economics, at the SED Central Committee. Additionally, from May 1976 (IX. Party Congress) to 1978, he was a candidate member and until April 1986 (XI. Party Congress), a full member of the Central Committee.

In 1982/1983, Häber and Philipp Jenninger supported the secret German-German credit project "Zurich Model," which was not realized due to the support of the billion-dollar credit negotiated between Franz Josef Strauß and Alexander Schalck-Golodkowski on the "South route" by Erich Honecker and Helmut Kohl.

As the head of the West Department of the SED Central Committee, Häber established close contacts with politicians from West Germany. Honecker's policy of German-German dialogue made him the ideal advocate for Honecker's Western policy within the Politburo. However, this policy faced significant resistance in the Soviet Union, especially from Chernenko and Ustinov.

In May 1984, he was surprisingly made a full member of the Politburo of the Central Committee, the de facto highest leadership body in East Germany, and Secretary of the Central Committee of the SED, responsible for International Politics and Economics, succeeding retiring longtime Politburo member Paul Verner.

Häber was awarded the Patriotic Order of Merit in 1964, 1966 and 1980 and the Banner of Labor in 1970.

=== Honecker's planned trip to West Germany ===
In the early summer of 1984, Honecker pushed for his plans for a state visit to West Germany, previously rejected by Moscow. Häber was tasked with preparing the visit. To dissuade Honecker from his travel plans, General Secretary of the CPSU Chernenko summoned him to Moscow. However, Honecker wanted to convince Chernenko of the necessity of such a visit during the meeting. "Write down all the reasons why a trip to Bonn is absolutely necessary," he told Häber, who advocated for a "coalition of reason" between the two German states and subsequently drafted a fundamental paper.

Honecker had to cancel his planned trip to West Germany. "The hidden threat from Chernenko, that deviating from the previous role of the SED as a follower of the CPSU could also have consequences for Honecker personally, prompted him to look for a scapegoat. He quickly found one in Herbert Häber."

=== Downfall ===
In 1985, Herbert Häber became a victim of an intrigue directed against him and his political objectives. The geopolitical interests represented by Chernenko and Ustinov combined with Honecker's political self-preservation instinct, who had trusted and supported Häber until 17 August 1985. Additionally, not only did the "Moscow faction" in the Politburo turn against Häber, but also the other members of the SED leadership did not resist his removal, which violated the statutes. He was even abandoned by his longtime friend and colleague Joachim Herrmann.

Häber was politically isolated, haunted by the Stasi on personal orders of Honecker, suffered a nervous breakdown and was admitted to the Government Hospital in Berlin-Buch on 18 August 1985, where, on 16 September, Honecker dictated his resignation letter "for health reasons." The SED Central Committee, SED leadership having spread rumors of him having cancer or being a CIA agent, dismissed him from the Politburo on 22 November 1985, "at his own request." Hermann Axen took on his responsibility as Central Committee Secretary. He had already been replaced as department head on 28 October by Gunter Rettner.

The stated reason for his removal was doubted from the beginning in both East and West.

Until 18 March 1986, Häber was accommodated in the District Hospital for Psychiatry in Bernburg (Saale). Häber was meant to stay there indefinitely and his release only came from the intervention of a doctor. Afterward, he worked until 1989 as an employee at the Academy of Social Sciences at the SED Central Committee. The job was a sinecure with no responsibility and nothing to do.

During the Peaceful Revolution, Häber was rehabilitated by the Werner Eberlein-led Central Party Control Commission at his own request. He also asked to be given a diplomatic job.

=== Reunified Germany ===
In the second Politburo trial, Herbert Häber, along with Politburo members Siegfried Lorenz and Hans-Joachim Böhme, had to answer for manslaughter by omission. The 5th (Leipzig) Criminal Senate of the Federal Court of Justice had overturned the verdict of the Berlin Regional Court and referred the case for a new trial and decision to another criminal chamber of the regional court. This, the 40th Grand Criminal Chamber, concluded the proceedings against Häber on 25 March 2004. His case, viewed differently from the beginning in the second Politburo trial, not least due to the statements of many witnesses – especially West German politicians, historians, and political observers – was concluded in three trial days with the surprising verdict quoted at the beginning.

On 11 May 2004, Häber was found guilty by the Berlin Regional Court of incitement to triple murder. The accused, as a member of the Politburo of the Central Committee of the SED, was deemed co-responsible for the deaths of three people shot at the former inner-German border, according to the court. However, Häber was not punished, as the court refrained from imposing a penalty on him. This decision was based on the argument that during his tenure in the political leadership of the GDR, Häber had advocated for a moderation of the border regime, leading to significant, including personal, disadvantages for him.

Häber lived in Berlin-Köpenick in his later years. He died in April 2020 at the age of 89 in Berlin.
