= Joachim Herrmann =

Joachim Herrmann may refer to:

- Joachim Herrmann (archaeologist), (1932–2010), East German archaeologist and academic
- Joachim Herrmann (CSU), (born 1956), German politician
- Joachim Herrmann (politician, born 1928)
