= Heinz Geggel =

East German journalist and party functionary (1921–2000)

- Geggel in his 1996 USC Shoah Foundation interview

Head of the Central Committee Agitation Department
- In office December 1973 – November 1989
- Secretary: Werner Lamberz; Joachim Herrmann; Günter Schabowski
- Preceded by: Hans Modrow
- Succeeded by: Position abolished

Head of the Central Committee West Department
- In office 1965 – December 1973
- Secretary: Albert Norden
- Preceded by: Arne Rehan
- Succeeded by: Herbert Häber

Personal details
- Born: 11 November 1921 Munich, Bavaria, Weimar Republic (now Germany)
- Died: 15 November 2000 (aged 79) Berlin, Germany
- Party: Socialist Unity Party (1948–1989)
- Other political affiliations: Communist Party of Germany (1944–1948)
- Education: "Karl Marx" Party Academy
- Occupation: Party Functionary; Journalist
- Central institution membership: 1971–1989: Full member, Central Committee; 1963–1971: Candidate member, Central Committee; Other offices held: 1963–1965: Deputy Head, West Commission at the Politburo; 1957–1960: Director, Deutschlandsender; 1956–1960: Deputy Chairman, State Broadcasting Committee

Heinz Geggel (11 November 1921 – 15 November 2000) was an East German journalist and party functionary of the Socialist Unity Party (SED).

Born to a Jewish family of merchants, Geggel fled Nazi Germany to Cuba, where he was involved with the Communist resistance to the Nazis. After the war he returned to the Soviet occupation zone, where he became a journalist. Geggel served as the longtime head of the powerful Central Committee Agitation Department where he played a pivotal role in the censorship of the East German press. He was nicknamed "Dr. Geggels" (in reference to Nazi propagandist Joseph Goebbels) by the journalists he directed and controlled.

== Life and career ==
=== Early life ===
Heinz Geggel was born on 11 November 1921 in Munich to a Jewish family of merchants. He attended primary and secondary school there from 1928 to 1936. Due to his Jewish heritage, he had to emigrate from Germany after the Nazis rose to power. He initially fled to Switzerland, where he completed an apprenticeship at a commercial school in Neuchâtel. In 1938, he moved to Belgium, studying textile engineering at a technical school in Verviers. When Belgium was invaded by Nazi Germany in May 1940, Geggel was interned in Brussels and forced into labor. He was later moved to internment camps in southern France, including the Gurs internment camp and Camp des Milles. His German citizenship had been revoked in 1940.

Geggel was redeemed in August 1941 and stayed in La Ciotat until December of that year, when he fled to Cuba via the neutral Casablanca. After a few odd jobs in Havana, he was trained as a diamond cutter by Jewish refugees from Antwerp. He became active in the German resistance against the Nazis, joining the Confederation of Cuban Workers and leading the Committee of German Antifascists in Cuba. In 1944, Geggel additionally joined the Communist Party of Germany (KPD) and dealt with the registration of German Nazis living in Cuba.

=== Journalist in the Soviet occupation zone and East Germany ===
After the war, he returned to Allied-occupied Germany in November 1947, arriving in Berlin via Frankfurt am Main in February 1948. He became a member of the ruling Socialist Unity Party (SED) in March 1948 and initially worked as an editor at Funkhaus Grünau. From 1949 to 1956, he was an editor and department head at the East German radio station Berliner Rundfunk. He concurrently attended the SED's "Karl Marx" Party Academy for a one-year course from 1953 to 1954.

In 1957, he was promoted to director of the Deutschlandsender, a radio station aimed at influencing West German listeners, concurrently serving as deputy chairman of its parent, East Germany's State Broadcasting Committee.

=== Central Committee apparatus ===
Geggel moved to the apparatus of the SED Central Committee in 1960 as head of the Politburo West Commission's SPD Working Group, briefly becoming secretary of the West Commission from 1962. In 1963, he was made deputy head of the West Commission, which was responsible for influencing West German politics. He was additionally elected to the Central Committee as a candidate member in January 1963 (VI. Party Congress).

Two years later, Geggel succeeded Arne Rehahn as head of the Central Committee West Department, which by 1965 had become the deciding Central Committee institution responsible for West Germany. Geggel's tenure at the department coincided with the underground work of the illegal SED-controlled West German KPD and its 1968 reestablishment as German Communist Party (DKP). In June 1971 (VIII. Party Congress), he was made a full member of the Central Committee, serving until its collective resignation in December 1989.

=== Agitation Department ===
In December 1973, he succeeded Hans Modrow, who was moved out of the Central Committee apparatus by Erich Honecker, as head of the Central Committee Agitation Department. From 1971, Geggel was also a board member of the Association of Journalists of the GDR.

As head of the Agitation Department, Geggel's task was to align the East German press with the political line of the SED.

Representatives of East German press organs were required to attend so-called "argumentation sessions" (German: Argumentationssitzungen) (Argus), held every Thursday in the Central Committee building, for this purpose. Officially meant to provide information, Geggel actually dictated which issues are to be reported on, with what priority and how; often, even detailed wording of headlines and specific phrases were prescribed during these Argus. Due to the atmosphere and his unyielding stance in these sessions, even questioning Geggel being suspect, journalists sometimes referred to him as "Dr. Geggels", in reference to Nazi propagandist Joseph Goebbels.

Geggel received several state awards during his time in the Central Committee apparatus, among other things he was awarded the Patriotic Order of Merit in 1959, 1964 and 1970, the Banner of Labor in 1968, 1971 and 1981, the Order of Karl Marx in 1981 and 1986, and the Hero of Labour title in 1984.

=== Peaceful Revolution ===
After Erich Honecker and Joachim Herrmann were removed from power in October 1989 during the Peaceful Revolution, Günter Schabowski, the new Central Committee Secretary responsible for the media, aimed to end the SED's meddling in the media. The Agitation Department was abolished and set to be replaced by an "Information Policy Office", Geggel still being involved in the transition. Geggel announced the new media policy at the second to last Argus on 19 October 1989. He acknowledged the negative effects of his department's interference in the press but refused to take responsibility, instead blaming the editors-in-chief.

In November 1989, Geggel resigned as department head and went into retirement. He was expelled from Association of Journalists in late January 1990 alongside Joachim Herrmann and other high-ranking Agitation Department officials as the people responsible for "abuse of the media". He died in Berlin on 15 November 2000 at the age of 79.

Geggel had a son in 1949, Thomas Geggel, who became a Stasi officer (reaching the rank of Oberleutnant by 1980), among other things responsible for healthcare facilities in Berlin-Lichtenberg. Thomas Geggel is now active in Jewish Voice for Peace.
