= Hans-Joachim Willerding =

German politician

Secretary for Foreign Information of the Central Committee Secretariat
- In office 8 November 1989 – 2 December 1989
- General Secretary: Egon Krenz
- Preceded by: Hermann Axen
- Succeeded by: Position abolished
Volkskammer
Member of the Volkskammer
In office 5 April 1990 – 2 October 1990
Preceded by	Constituency established
Succeeded by	Constituency abolished
Constituency	Bezirk Frankfurt (Oder)
In office 25 June 1981 – 5 April 1990
Preceded by	multi-member district
Succeeded by	Constituency abolished
Constituency	Angermünde, Eberswalde, Bad Freienwalde, Schwedt/Oder

Personal details
- Born: Hans-Joachim Willerding; 19 April 1952 (age 74) Pankow, East Berlin, East Germany
- Party: Party of Democratic Socialism
- Other political affiliations: Socialist Unity Party (1971–1989)
- Education: Moscow State Institute of International Relations; Wilhelm Pieck University Rostock (Dr. phil.)
- Occupation: Politician; Party Functionary
- Awards: Patriotic Order of Merit, 2nd class; Star of People's Friendship, 2nd class
- Central institution membership: 1989: Candidate member, Politburo of the Central Committee; 1989: Full member, Central Committee; 1986–1989: Candidate member, Central Committee; Other offices held: 1982–1990: Chairman, Free German Youth in the Volkskammer; 1981–1982: Deputy Chairman, Free German Youth in the Volkskammer

Hans-Joachim "Jochen" Willerding (born 19 April 1952) is a former politician (SED) of the German Democratic Republic.

On 8 November 1989 he was elected to membership of the powerful Central Committee of the country's ruling Socialist Unity Party where he sat as the committee's youngest member. A couple of days later the Berlin Wall was breached, setting in motion events that would lead to reunification in October 1990. Much sooner than that, however, the promising career of Willerding at the top level of the East Germany's political power structure was cut short on 2 December 1989 when the Central Committee resigned en masse.

== Life and career ==
=== Early career ===
Then son of the diplomat Klaus Willerding, Jochen Willerding was born in Berlin where he attended school between 1958 and 1964. Between 1964 and 1968 he received his schooling in Ulan Bator where his father was serving as the East German ambassador. His father's next posting, between 1969 and 1972, was to Hanoi, but the boy returned to East Germany, undertaking the final three years of his schooling at Bad Freienwalde and passing his final school exams in 1972. He had joined the Free German Youth organisation (FDJ/) Freie Deutsche Jugend) in 1966 and the ruling (SED / Sozialistische Einheitspartei Deutschlands) in 1971. He then relocated to Moscow in 1972, where he studied at the State Institute of International Relations and received his degree in 1977. He obtained his doctorate, from the Wilhelm Pieck University (as it was then called) in Rostock just a year later.

=== FDJ career ===
Willerding had already, in 1971/72, worked as an instructor in the FDJ, and after completing his studies he returned to the organisation, which was in effect the youth wing of the SED, as a ahead office official. From he was a member of the FDJ Central Committee and from 1979 Secretary responsible for Work with the West (für "Westarbeit" - essentially with West Germany). Later, in 1982, he would also become deputy chairman of the FDJ.

In 1981 he was elected a member of the National Legislature (Volkskammer). Although he was a member of the ruling SED (party), in the Volkskammer he sat as a representative of the FDJ which, as an approved quasi-political mass movement, received a quota of 37 seats. From 1982 till 11 November 1989, he led the FDJ group in the chamber. He was also a member of the Volkskammer Committee on Foreign Affairs.

=== Peaceful Revolution ===
In 1986 the name of Hans-Joachim Willerding appeared on the candidate list for membership of the party Central Committee. This was an important step under a constitutional structure that by now expressly asserted the "leading role" of the party, above government ministers and the national legislature. On 8 November 1989 he was elected to Central Committee membership and proposed by Hans Modrow for membership of the Central Committee secretariat and Politburo. At 37 Willerding was the youngest member of the nation's newly expanded leadership team. However, November 1989 Berlin Wall was breached by protestors, and once it became apparent that the occupying military forces had no orders to suppress the popular demonstrations by force, it appeared that nothing stood in the way of the momentum building for German reunification. On 2 December 1989, the Central Committee recognized its powerlessness to shape events, and resigned. East Germany's first and last free election would follow in March 1990.

East Germany's (hitherto ruling) SED (party) now responded swiftly to the tide of events by renaming and then reinventing itself as the Party of Democratic Socialism (PDS /) Partei des Demokratischen Sozialismus). The reborn party held its first Party Conference on 9 December 1989, and Jochen Willerding was one of those elected to the Party Presidium. He was also a member of the party's Commission for International Policy: in this capacity he traveled to Moscow and participated on 12 September 1990 in the important meeting with Valentin Falin, then Central Committee Secretary of the Soviet party's and Chairman of its International Section. The meeting concerned the Soviet attitude to German reunification, formal implementation of which would take place in October 1990.

The 1990 General election took place on 18 March and Willerding was a candidate. Between 1950 and 1986 national elections in the German Democratic Republic had been organised according to a single list system whereby voters could vote to support or reject a single list of candidates. The record indicated that the single list had always been supported by more than 99% of those voting. For 1990, however, each party was permitted to place its own candidate list before the electorate. The PDS gained 16.4% of the national vote, entitling it to 66 seats in the National assembly (Volkskammer), and Jochen Willerding's name was high enough up his party's list to give him a seat in the new chamber. He sat as a PDS member till 3 October 1990, which was when the East Germany national assembly dissolved itself in order to make way for the first election of the reunited Germany, which duly took place on 3 December 1990.

=== Reunified Germany ===
Following reunification Willerding withdrew from politics and worked in the private sector, later operating as a consultant to German companies working in Russia and China.

== Awards and honours ==
- 1983 Patriotic Order of Merit in Bronze
- 1985 Patriotic Order of Merit in Silver
- 1989 Star of People's Friendship in Silver
