= Rock Hard (magazine) =

German music magazine

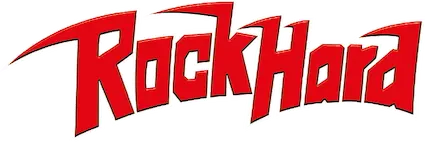
- Editor-in-chief: Boris Kaiser
- Categories: Rock, heavy metal
- Frequency: Monthly
- Circulation: 80,000
- Publisher: Holger Stratmann
- First issue: November–December 1983
- Company: Rock Hard Verlags- und Handels-GmbH
- Country: Germany
- Based in: Dortmund
- Language: German
- Website: rockhard.de
- ISSN: 1437-8140

Rock Hard (also RockHard) is a German music magazine published in Dortmund, with additional language editions in various countries worldwide, including France, Spain, Brazil, Portugal, Italy, Greece, and Slovenia. The magazine focuses on hard rock and heavy metal, offering content such as reports, interviews, specials, reviews, and news.

== Overview ==
Alongside the German edition of Metal Hammer, it is the leading magazine for metal and hard rock in Germany. The German news magazine Der Spiegel has referred to it as the Zentralorgan ("central organ") of heavy metal fandom in Germany; others have described it as a Kultzeitschrift ("cult magazine"). Founded by Holger Stratmann, more than 440 issues have been published in Germany since its inception in 1983, and it has been published monthly since 1989. Rock Hard magazine operates independently from major media companies. Its slogan is "critical, competent, independent." Since 1990, magazine staff have also organized the Rock Hard Festival, which has been held annually in Gelsenkirchen over the Pentecost weekend since 2003. The festival is streamed by the news magazine Spiegel Online, the internet edition of Der Spiegel, and by WDR television under the Rockpalast label.

Götz Kühnemund served as editor-in-chief of Rock Hard from 1990 until January 2014, when he, along with several other editors, departed the magazine due to financial constraints and creative differences with the magazine's founder and publisher, Holger Stratmann. Kühnemund, a prominent figure in the German metal scene, was known for his commitment to preserving what he termed "real heavy metal," resisting the push toward more commercial influences and opening the magazine to diverse metal substyles. His departure was likened to "the pope leaving the church." Following his exit, Kühnemund founded a new magazine titled Deaf Forever. Boris Kaiser and Michael Rensen took over as co-editors-in-chief, but since February 2016, only Boris Kaiser has held the title, while Michael Rensen has returned to his role as an editor.

Rock Hard maintained its own music streaming channel on the internet video portal Putpat.tv. Additionally, it publishes its own mobile app, available on both iTunes and Google Play. This development was a response to declining sales of the printed magazine, a trend that has impacted all music publications in Germany in recent years and has also compelled Rock Hard to "concentrate on the core business," utilizing the online sector for marketing and supplementary services.
