= Braunbuch =

1965 non-fiction work by Albert Norden

Braunbuch – Kriegs- und Naziverbrecher in der Bundesrepublik
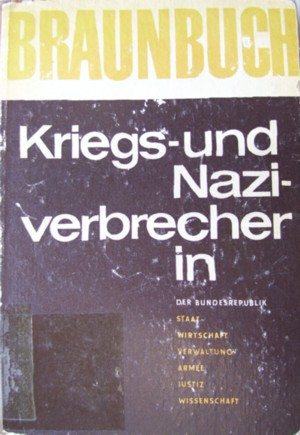
- Braunbuch
- Editor: Albert Norden
- Language: German
- Subject: War and Nazi Criminals in West Germany
- Genre: Non-fiction
- Publication date: 2 July 1965
- Publication place: German Democratic Republic
- Media type: Print

Braunbuch – Kriegs- und Nazi-verbrecher in der Bundesrepublik: Staat – Wirtschaft – Verwaltung – Armee – Justiz – Wissenschaft (German for "Brown Book – War and Nazi Criminals in the Federal Republic: State, Economy, Administration, Army, Justice, Science") is a book edited by Albert Norden and published by the German Democratic Republic (East Germany) in 1965. In this book Norden claimed that 1,800 politicians and other prominent figures in Federal Republic of Germany (West Germany) had held prominent positions in Nazi Germany prior to 1945.

Altogether 1,800 West German persons and their past were covered: especially 21 Ministers and state secretaries, 100 admirals and generals, 828 judges or state lawyers and high law officers, 245 officials of the Foreign Office and of embassies and consulates in leading positions, 297 high police officers and officers of the Verfassungsschutz. The first brown book was seized in West Germany – on Frankfurt Book Fair – by judicial resolution.

The contents of this book received substantial attention in West Germany and other countries. The West German government stated, at that time, that it was "all falsification". Later on, however, it became clear that the data of the book were largely correct. Hanns Martin Schleyer, for example, really had been a member of the SS. The book was translated into 10 languages. Amongst the reactions to it was also a similar West German book of the same name, covering the topic of Nazis re-emerging in high-level positions in the GDR.

In addition to the Braunbuch the educational booklet Das ganze System ist braun (The whole system is brown) was published in the GDR.

== See also ==
- The Brown Book of the Reichstag Fire and Hitler Terror
- Brown Book (album)
