= Joachim Herrmann (politician, born 1928) =

Leader of East Germany from 1971 to 1989

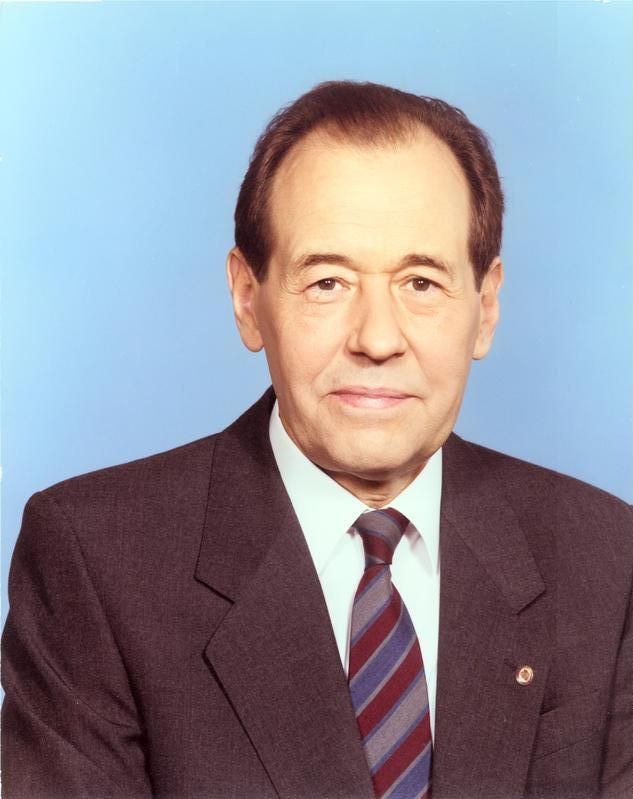
- Herrmann in 1988

Editor-in-chief of Neues Deutschland
- In office 7 July 1971 – 15 March 1978
- Deputy: Hajo Herbell; Harri Czepuck; Sander Drobela; Günter Kertzscher; Günter Schabowski
- Preceded by: Rudolf Singer
- Succeeded by: Günter Schabowski

State Secretary for West German Affairs (Note: "All-German Affairs" in 1966)
- In office January 1966 – July 1971
- Chairman of the Council of Ministers: Willi Stoph
- Deputy: Arne Rehahn; Herbert Häber
- Preceded by: Position established
- Succeeded by: Position abolished

Editor-in-chief of Berliner Zeitung
- In office February 1962 – December 1965
- Preceded by: Theo Grandy
- Succeeded by: Rolf Lehnert
Volkskammer
Member of the Volkskammer for East Berlin
In office 25 June 1981 – 16 November 1989
Preceded by	Constituency established
Succeeded by	Petra Flemming
Constituency	Berlin-Mitte, Berlin-Friedrichshain, №1
In office 29 October 1976 – 25 June 1981
Preceded by	Walter Halbritter
Succeeded by	Gerald Götting
Constituency	Bitterfeld, Gräfenhainichen, Wittenberg, №1

Central Committee Secretariat responsibilities
- 1979–1989: Friendly Parties
- 1978–1989: Agitation
- 1978–1989: Propaganda
- 1978–1983: "Karl Marx" Party Academy

Personal details
- Born: 29 October 1928 Berlin, Free State of Prussia, Weimar Republic (now Germany)
- Died: 30 July 1992 (aged 63) Berlin, Germany
- Party: SED-PDS (1989–1990)
- Other political affiliations: Socialist Unity Party (1948–1989)
- Occupation: Politician; Party Functionary; Journalist
- Awards: Banner of Labor; Patriotic Order of Merit, 1st class; Order of Karl Marx
- Central institution membership: 1978–1989: Full member, Politburo of the Central Committee; 1973–1978: Candidate member, Politburo of the Central Committee; 1971–1989: Full member, Central Committee; 1967–1971: Candidate member, Central Committee; Other offices held: 1978–1989: Head, Agitation Commission at the Politburo; 1958–1960; 1963–1989: Member, Agitation Commission at the Politburo; 1960–1972: Member, West Commission at the Politburo

Joachim "Achim" Herrmann (29 October 1928 – 30 July 1992) was a journalist and high-ranking party functionary of the Socialist Unity Party (SED).

Herrmann initially had a career as journalist for the SED's various party newspapers, first for the Berliner Zeitung, then, after a stint as State Secretary for West German Affairs, for the SED Zentralorgan Neues Deutschland.

From the late 1970s, he was a member of the Politburo of the Central Committee of the SED and the powerful SED Agitation Secretary, de facto commanding East German press. Herrmann was a part of Erich Honecker's inner circle, closely working with him to align the news to the party's and Honecker's personal liking, due this the opposition rumored that he might become the successor of Honecker.

Herrmann was one of the first high-ranking SED functionaries to be deposed during the Peaceful Revolution, being removed from the Politburo alongside Honecker in October and expelled from the Central Committee in November 1989. He died not long after in reunified Germany.

== Life ==
=== Early career ===
From 1938 to 1945 he was a member of the Hitler Youth, and was drafted towards the end of World War II as a Luftwaffe auxiliary.

=== Journalist ===
He became a journalist, and by 1949 was working at the Berliner Zeitung. He then joined the ruling Socialist Unity Party (SED). From 1949 to 1952 he was deputy editor-in-chief of the Freie Deutsche Jugend's paper Junge Welt, and from 1954 to 1960, he was editor-in-chief. During that time he served as a member of the Central Council of the FDJ.

From 1960 to 1962 he worked as deputy head of a department in the Central Committee of the SED. He then served from 1962 to 1965 as editor-in-chief of the Berliner Zeitung, the newspaper of the Berlin SED.

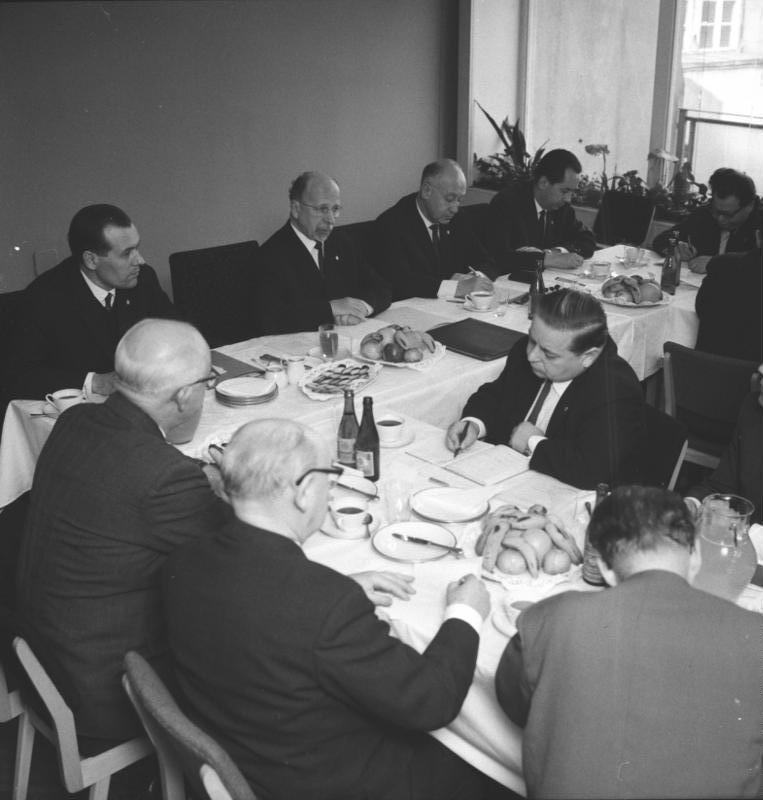
Herrmann (left) as State Secretary at a meeting of the Council for All-German Affairs in February 1966

In January 1966, Herrmann was made head of the newly created State Secretariat for All-German Affairs, renamed to West German Affairs the same year. As State Secretary, Herrmann was tasked with influencing West German public opinion towards the SED's conception of a reunified Germany under their rule. His deputy was Herbert Häber, a longtime associate and friend, who he already knew from their common Berlin FDJ time. Despite this, when Häber faced an intrigue directed against him and his political objectives, Herrmann abandoned him. The State Secretariat was abolished in July 1971, as part of new SED leader Erich Honecker's policy of distancing from German reunification.

He subsequently became the editor-in-chief of the SED Zentralorgan Neues Deutschland in 1971.

During this time he quickly rose among government circles. Having already been elected as a candidate member in April 1967 (VII. Party Congress), he became a full member of the Central Committee in June 1971 (VIII. Party Congress). In 1973, he became a candidate member of the Politburo of the Central Committee, the de facto highest leadership body in East Germany.

=== Central Committee Secretary ===
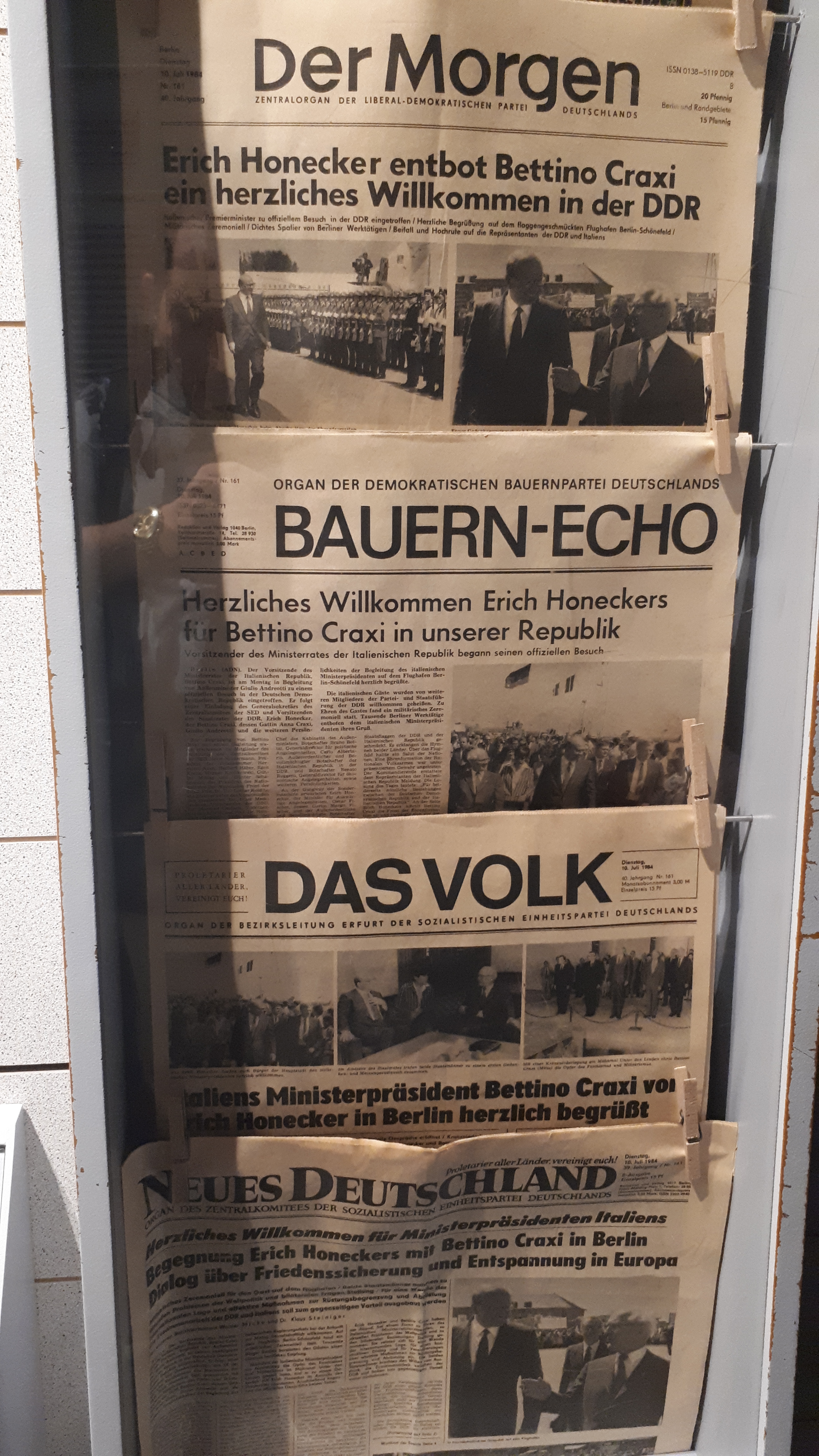
East German newspapers on 10 July 1984, having almost identical wording

On 25 May 1978, Herrmann was made a full member of the Politburo and elected to the Central Committee Secretariat. There he took on the responsibilities of Propaganda, Agitation (both from Werner Lamberz, who had been killed in a helicopter crash) and so-called "Friendly Parties" (meaning satellite parties) from retiring Politburo member Albert Norden.

As Agitation Secretary, Herrmann wielded absolute power over East German press, most of which was directly owned by the SED. Together with his department head Heinz Geggel, who held weekly 'argumentation sessions' at the SED headquarters, Herrmann controlled East German reporting in minute detail, setting out the wording of headlines, arrangement of pictures and specific phrases, usually acting on the orders of Erich Honecker, whom he met alone after every meeting of the Politburo.

Herrmann quickly became part of Erich Honecker's inner circle, alongside Günter Mittag and Erich Mielke, shunning most of the other Politburo members to rubber stamp decisions pre-approved by them. At the same time, he was regarded as a mere "executor" of Honecker's media policy.

Herrmann has been described as the "polar opposite" of his predecessor Lamberz. Whereas Lamberz was seen as open-minded and cosmopolitan, Herrmann was regarded as self-opinionated and authoritarian, with a chaotic style of work. Herrmann was insensate in dealing with artists and clueless about new media beyond his scope as former newspaper editor such as television.

=== Peaceful Revolution ===
On 18 October 1989, a group of Politburo members led by Egon Krenz deposed of Erich Honecker. Due to their close relation to Honecker, Herrmann and Economics czar Günter Mittag were also removed. Günter Schabowski, his former deputy and successor as editor-in-chief of Neues Deutschland, succeeded him as Agitation Secretary. Herrmann did not protest, taking on the responsibility for the negative developments in the media.

On 10 November 1989, he was expelled from the SED Central Committee, as part of a move to save face by General Secretary Egon Krenz. He was additionally removed by his party from the Volkskammer a week later, on 16 November 1989.

On 20 January 1990, he was expelled from the now-renamed SED-PDS party in a unanimous vote, the party Central Arbitration Commission citing personal enrichment and his manipulation of the media.

He died in Berlin in July 1992 of cancer.

== Awards ==
Hermann received the Banner of Labor Order in 1968, the Patriotic Order of Merit in 1970, and the Order of Karl Marx in 1978 and 1988.
