= Albert Norden =

German politician (1904–1982)

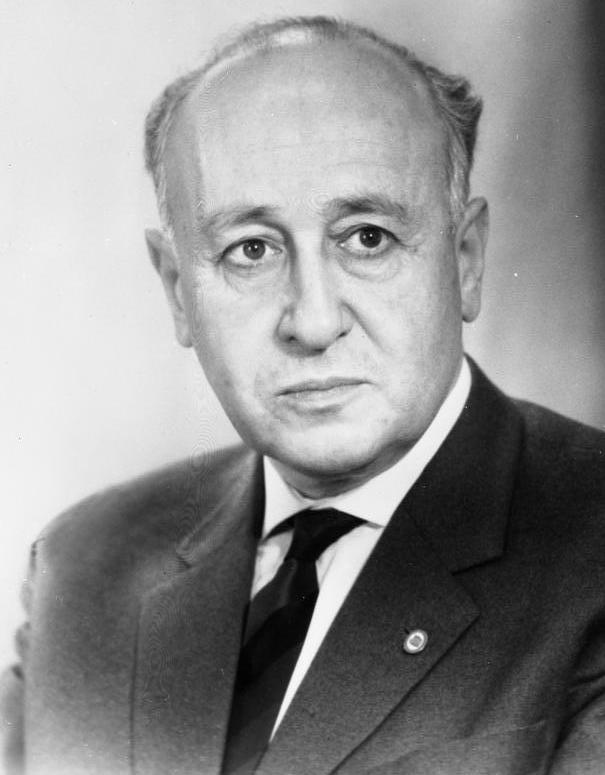
- Norden in 1963

Secretary for Friendly Parties of the Central Committee Secretariat
- In office June 1971 – January 1979
- General Secretary: Erich Honecker
- Preceded by: Hermann Matern
- Succeeded by: Joachim Herrmann

Secretary for Foreign Information of the Central Committee Secretariat
- In office 15 April 1955 – January 1979
- General Secretary: Walter Ulbricht; Erich Honecker
- Preceded by: Hermann Axen
- Succeeded by: Hermann Axen

Secretary for Agitation of the Central Committee Secretariat
- In office 15 April 1955 – 22 April 1967
- First Secretary: Walter Ulbricht
- Preceded by: Hermann Axen
- Succeeded by: Werner Lamberz

Secretary for Party Academy "Karl Marx" of the Central Committee Secretariat
- In office 15 April 1955 – 22 April 1967
- First Secretary: Walter Ulbricht
- Preceded by: Fred Oelßner
- Succeeded by: Werner Lamberz

Personal details
- Born: Albert Norden; 4 December 1904 Myslowitz, Province of Silesia, Kingdom of Prussia, German Empire (now Mysłowice, Poland)
- Died: 30 May 1982 (aged 77) East Berlin, East Germany
- Resting place: Memorial of the Socialists, Friedrichsfelde Central Cemetery
- Party: KPD (1920–1946); SED (1946–1982)
- Spouse: Herta Fischer (m. 1940)
- Children: Johnny
- Occupation: Politician; Academic; Journalist; Carpenter
- Central institution membership: 1958–1981: Full member, Politburo of the Central Committee; 1955–1981: Full member, Central Committee; Other offices held: 1976–1981: Member, State Council; 1960–1979: Member, National Defence Council; 1960–1979: Head, West Commission at the Politburo; 1955–1967: Head, Agitation Commission at the Politburo; 1949–1950; 1958–1981: Member, Volkskammer; 1949: Member, German People's Congress

Albert Norden (4 December 1904 – 30 May 1982) was a German communist politician, academic and journalist who held several senior positions in the ruling Socialist Unity Party of East Germany from the 1950s until his retirement in 1981. Among his responsibilities were domestic and foreign propaganda, the Party Academy "Karl Marx", and the National Front. He also edited the Braunbuch, published in 1965, in which nearly 2,000 leading West Germans were named as former Nazis.

== Early years ==
Albert Norden was born in Myslowitz, Silesia on 4 December 1904, one of the five recorded children born to the liberal rabbi Joseph Norden (1870–1943) and his wife, Emilie Meseritz/Norden (1876–1931).

In 1919, he joined the Young Communist League of Germany. The following year, he became a member of the Communist Party of Germany. From 1923 onwards, he held editorial positions in various communist publications. Between 1931 and 1933, he was the deputy editor-in-chief of Die Rote Fahne ("The Red Flag"); he retained this position despite supporting Heinz Neumann in challenging party leader Ernst Thälmann.

== In exile ==
In 1933 Norden emigrated to France. He also spent time in exile in Denmark and Czechoslovakia. In 1938, he returned to France. Norden was detained in France 1939–1940. In 1941, he was able to emigrate to the United States. During World War II, his father died in the Theresienstadt concentration camp.

In exile in Paris and New York he worked with various popular front publications. He wrote some chapters, dealing with the international linkages of the German NSDAP, in the widely read 1933 Braunbuch über Reichstagsbrand und Hitlerterror ('Brown Book on Reichstag Fire and Hitler Terror'). In 1940, he married Herta Fischer (1908–1990), and their son, Johnny, was born in October 1942. In October 1946 he returned to Berlin, where he became editor of the weekly Deutschlands Stimme ('Voice of Germany').

== Political career in East Germany ==
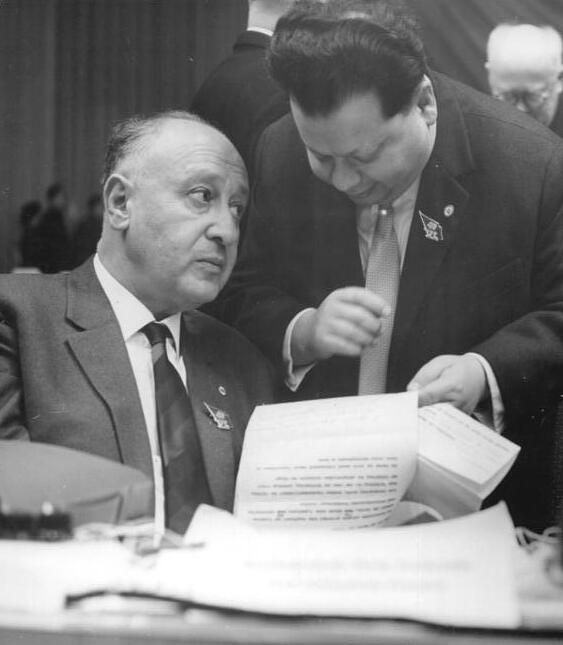
Norden with Hermann Axen at the 6th Party Congress of the SED, 15 January 1963

In 1949, he was assigned as head of the Press Section of the Information Department of Ministerial Council of the German Democratic Republic, working under Gerhart Eisler. In December 1952, he was purged from his position in the Press Department, but obtained a professorship at Humboldt University.

In 1954, he became director of the National Council of the National Front for a Democratic Germany. He would also become director of the Committee for German Unity. In 1955, he became a member of the Central Committee of the Socialist Unity Party of Germany (SED). He was elected as one of the secretaries of the Central Committee. In 1958 he became a member of the Politburo of the party.

Norden served as head of the Agitation Committee of the Politburo, 1955–67. He was in-charge of the Information & Foreign Department of the Politburo until 1979. In 1958, he became a member of the Volkskammer (People's Chamber, the parliament of the GDR). In 1960 he became the head of the 'West Commission'. In June 1965 Norden suggested that regional elections in the German Democratic Republic should be open for alternate candidates.

In 1963, Norden became a member of the National Defense Council, a post he held until 1979. In 1976 he became a member of the State Council. In April 1981, the then ailing Norden was left out of the Central Committee and Politburo at the 10th SED party congress. In the same year he left the Volkskammer and State Council positions.

== Brown Book ==
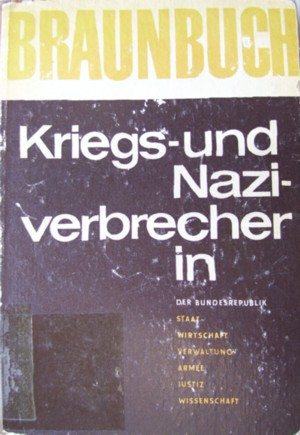
Cover of the first edition of the Braunbuch, 1965

After the war Norden argued in several publications, articles and speeches that there was a direct continuation between the Hitler and Adenauer governments. In 1965 the National Front published a work by Norden, Braunbuch ('Brown Book'), in which he accused over 1,900 politicians, state officials and other prominent persons in West Germany of having worked for the Nazi regime in the past. The book became a reference in the West German New Left, which increasingly had begun to question the official historiography on the Nazi period.

== Religious identity ==
Norden was born into a Jewish petty bourgeois family, the son of a rabbi. As an adult, Norden declined to identify himself as a Jew. He was however, one of the most prominent persons of Jewish origin in East German society.
