= Zentralorgan =

Zentralorgan is a 19th-century German term for journals associated with a certain technical field, party or political movement. Later it was reduced to a term for official party papers and journals of socialist and worker parties since the 19th century.

Besides the Die Welt, Zentralorgan der Zionistischen Vereinigung (main newspaper of the zionist movement founded by Theodor Herzl) or Zentralorgan für die gesamte Chirurgie und ihre Grenzgebiete (an important medical newspaper dealing with surgery) most famous examples are the Vorwärts, owned by the SPD. Within the GDR, the daily newspaper Neues Deutschland was Zentralorgan of the Socialist Unity Party of Germany. Zentralorgan of the youth association Freie Deutsche Jugend was the daily newspaper Junge Welt.

Another use of Zentralorgan is found in important journals in certain fields; e.g. the computer magazine c't has been dubbed Zentralorgan of Nerdistan; and Rock Hard has been dubbed the Zentralorgan of heavy metal fandom in Germany.

Another more derogative use is to describe an important news outlet that suppresses certain opinions in which deviant opinions are unwanted.
