= Hans Modrow =

Leader of East Germany from 1989 to 1990

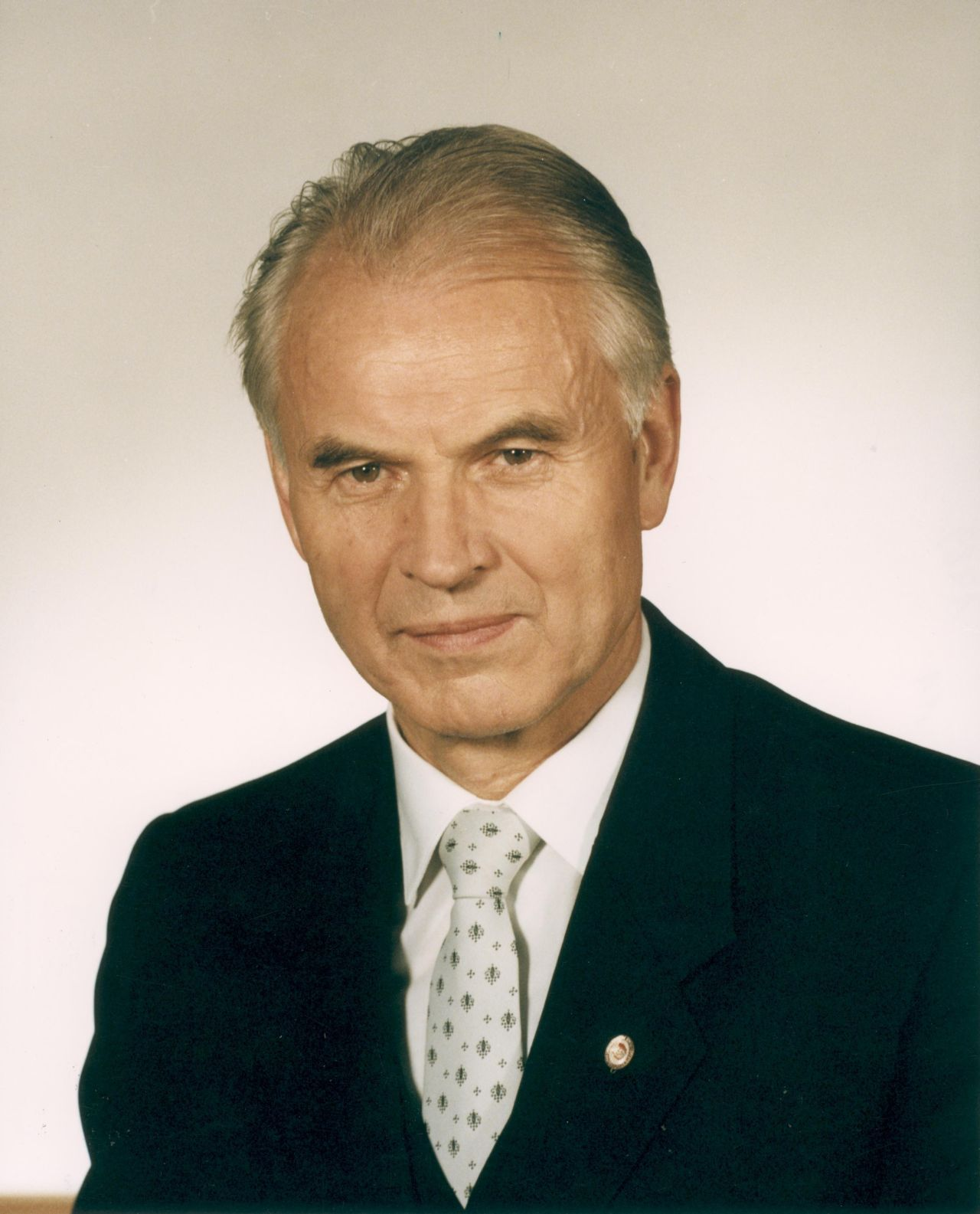
- Modrow in 1989

Chairman of the Council of Ministers
- In office 13 November 1989 – 12 April 1990
- Head of state: Egon Krenz; Manfred Gerlach; Sabine Bergmann-Pohl (interim)
- Deputy: Christa Luft; Peter Moreth; Lothar de Maizière
- Preceded by: Willi Stoph
- Succeeded by: Lothar de Maizière (as Minister-President)

First Secretary of the Socialist Unity Party in Bezirk Dresden
- In office 3 October 1973 – 15 November 1989
- Second Secretary: Lothar Stammnitz
- Preceded by: Werner Krolikowski
- Succeeded by: Hansjoachim Hahn

Head of the Agitation Department of the Central Committee
- In office 19 June 1971 – 2 October 1973
- Secretary: Werner Lamberz
- Deputy: Herbert Malcherek; Günter Fischer; Eberhard Fensch; Hans-Joachim Kobert
- Preceded by: Werner Lamberz
- Succeeded by: Heinz Geggel
Parliamentary constituencies
Member of the European Parliament for Germany
In office 20 July 1999 – 20 July 2004
Preceded by	Multi-member district
Succeeded by	Multi-member district
Member of the Bundestag for Mecklenburg-Vorpommern
In office 3 October 1990 – 10 November 1994
Preceded by	Constituency established
Succeeded by	Multi-member district
Member of the Volkskammer
In office 5 April 1990 – 2 October 1990
Preceded by	Constituency established
Succeeded by	Constituency abolished
Constituency	Neubrandenburg
In office 11 December 1957 – 5 April 1990
Preceded by	Karl-Heinz Kniestedt
Succeeded by	Constituency abolished
Constituency	Dresden-Süd, Dresden-West, Dresden-Mitte (1976–1990); Berlin (1957–1976)

Personal details
- Born: 27 January 1928 Jasenitz, Pomerania, Germany
- Died: 10 February 2023 (aged 95) Berlin, Germany
- Party: SED (1949–1989); PDS (1989–2007); Die Linke (2007–2023)
- Spouse: Annemarie Straubing (m. 2003)
- Children: 2
- Education: Party Academy Karl Marx; Hochschule für Ökonomie Berlin; Humboldt University of Berlin (Dr. rer. oec.)
- Occupation: Economist; locksmith; politician
- Central institution membership: 1989: Full member, Politburo of the Central Committee; 1967–1989: Full member, Central Committee; 1958–1967: Candidate member, Central Committee; Other offices held: 1967–1973: Secretary for Agitation and Propaganda, Socialist Unity Party in Berlin; 1961–1967: First Secretary, Socialist Unity Party in Berlin-Köpenick; 1958: Chairman, Free German Youth in the Volkskammer; 1953–1961: First Secretary, Free German Youth in Berlin
- De facto leader of the GDR: ← Krenz; (Last in role) →

Hans Modrow (German pronunciation: [ˈhans ˈmoːdʁo]; 27 January 1928 – 10 February 2023) was a German politician best known as the last communist premier of East Germany.

Coming into office amidst the Peaceful Revolution, he was the de facto leader of East Germany through the winter of 1989–90. He presided over a transitional government, paving the way to the first and only free elections in East Germany. His cabinet was the last over which the Socialist Unity Party (SED) presided, as well as the first to include opposition members.

After the end of Communist rule and reunification of Germany, he was convicted of electoral fraud and perjury by the Dresden District Court in 1995, on the basis that he had been the SED official nominally in charge of the electoral process. He was later convicted of the first charge and was given a nine-month suspended sentence. He was one of the few high-ranking former SED officials retained by its successor, the Party of Democratic Socialism (PDS), of which he became honorary chairman. He was the president of the "council of elders" of the PDS' successor, the Left Party, from 2007.

== Early life and education ==
Modrow was born on 27 January 1928 in Jasenitz, Province of Pomerania, German Reich, now Jasienica, part of the town of Police in Poland. As a child he was a Hitler Youth leader and attended a Volksschule. He trained as a machinist from 1942 to 1945 when he was filled with intense hatred of the Bolsheviks, whom he deemed as subhumans, inferior to Germans physically and morally. For six months during the Allied bombing of Stettin he served as a volunteer firefighter. He later served briefly in the Volkssturm in January 1945, and was subsequently captured as a prisoner of war by the Soviet Red Army in Stralsund in May 1945. He and other German prisoners were sent to a farm in Hinterpommern to work. Upon arrival, his backpack was stolen, making him begin to rethink the Germans' so-called camaraderie. Days later, he was appointed a driver to a Soviet captain, who asked him about Heinrich Heine, a German poet. Modrow had never heard of him and felt embarrassed that the people he thought of as "subhumans" knew more about German culture than he. Transported to a POW camp near Moscow, he joined a National Committee for a Free Germany anti-fascist school run by future SED Politburo member Alfred Neumann for Wehrmacht members and received training in Marxism–Leninism, which he embraced. Upon release in 1949 he worked as a machinist for LEW Hennigsdorf. That same year he joined the Socialist Unity Party (SED).

From 1949 to 1961, Modrow worked in various functions for the Free German Youth (FDJ) in Brandenburg, Mecklenburg, and Berlin and in 1952 and 1953 studied at the Komsomol college in Moscow. In 1953, he attended the state funeral of Joseph Stalin. After Nikita Khrushchev's Secret Speech at the 20th Party Congress condemning Stalin and beginning de-Stalinization, Modrow claimed to have complained to his former teacher Neumann "Comrade, this is unacceptable — you are accusing us of having learned Stalin off by heart, but I never had the inclination to do this myself, you asked us to!" From 1953 to 1961, he served as an FDJ functionary in East Berlin. From 1954 to 1957, he studied at the SED's Karl Marx School in Berlin, graduating as a social scientist. In 1959 to 1961 he studied at the University of Economics in Berlin-Karlshorst and obtained the degree of graduate economist. He gained his doctorate at the Humboldt University of Berlin in 1966. West Germany's Federal Intelligence Service (BND) kept Modrow under observation from 1958 to 2013.

== Communist party career ==
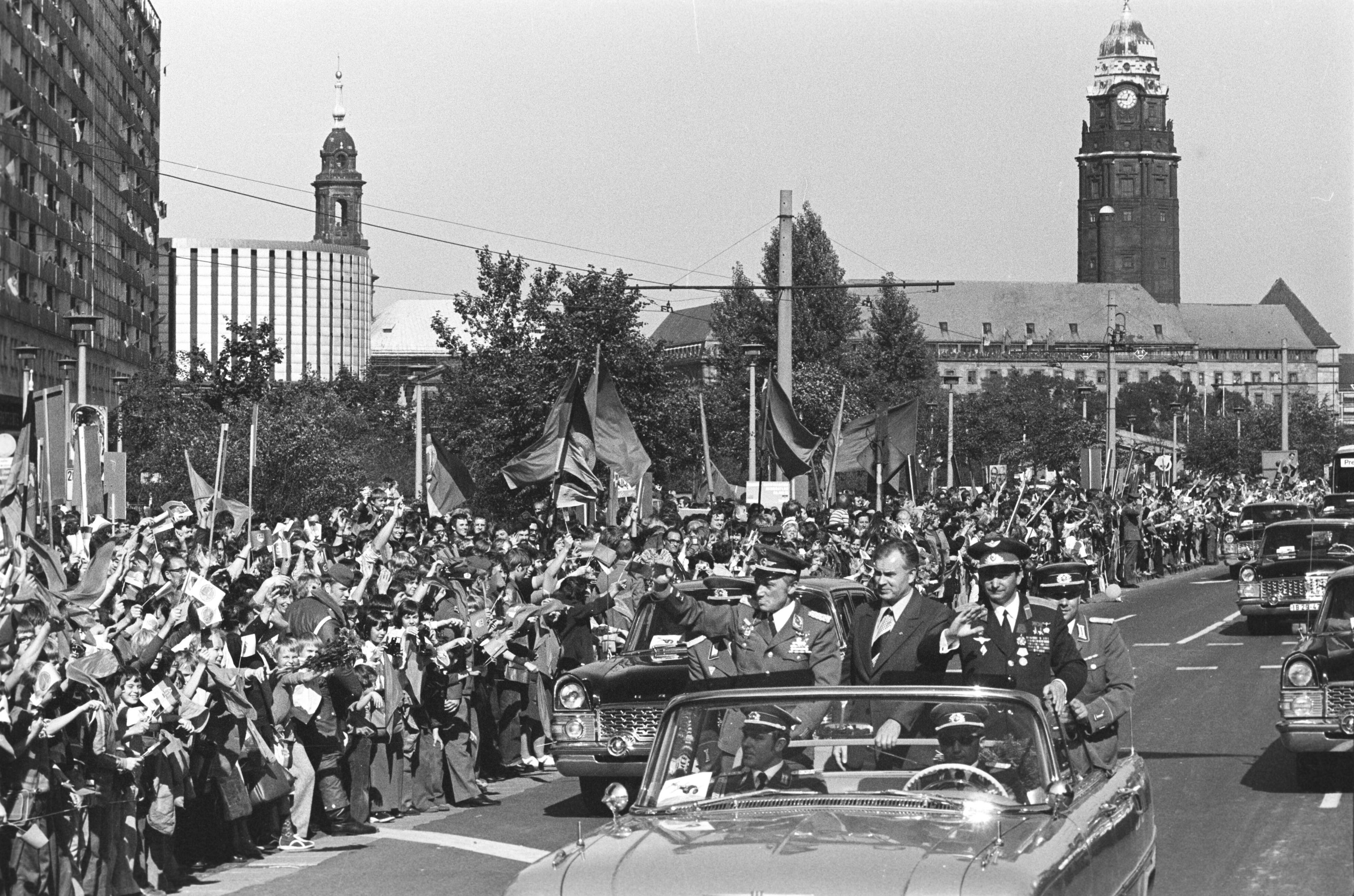
Modrow (center) rides through Dresden in a motorcade with cosmonauts Sigmund Jähn (left) and Valery Bykovsky (right), 25 September 1978

Modrow had a long political career in East Germany, serving as a member of the Volkskammer from 1957 to 1990 and in the SED's Central Committee (ZK) from 1967 to 1989, having previously been a candidate for the ZK from 1958 to 1967. From 1961 to 1967 he was first secretary of the district administration of the SED in Berlin-Köpenick and secretary for agitation and propaganda from 1967 to 1971 in the SED's district leadership in Berlin. During this time he was involved in the formation of the Union Berlin football club, which is based in the Köpenick district. From 1971 to 1973 he worked as the head of the SED's Department for Agitation. In 1975 he was awarded the GDR's Patriotic Order of Merit in gold and received the award of the Order of Karl Marx in 1978.

From 1973 onward, he was the SED's first secretary in Bezirk Dresden, making him the top official in East Germany's third-largest district. He was prevented from rising to national office, largely because he was one of the few in leadership to publicly oppose Erich Honecker. He developed some important contacts with the Soviet Union, including eventual Soviet leader Mikhail Gorbachev. Modrow initially supported Gorbachev's glasnost and perestroika reforms. In early 1987, Gorbachev and the KGB considered facilitating Honecker's ouster with a view to bringing Modrow to leadership. From 1988 to 1989, the Stasi, under the orders of Honecker and Erich Mielke, vigorously investigated Modrow to attempt to frame him for high treason.

== Peaceful Revolution and premiership ==
During the Peaceful Revolution of 1989, Modrow ordered thousands of Volkspolizei, Stasi, Combat Groups of the Working Class, and National People's Army troops to crush a demonstration at the Dresden Hauptbahnhof on 4–5 October. Some 1,300 people were arrested. In a top secret and encrypted telex to Honecker on 9 October, Modrow reported: "With the determined commitment of the comrades of the security organs, anti-state terrorist riots were suppressed".

When Honecker was toppled on 18 October, Gorbachev hoped that Modrow would replace him; Egon Krenz was selected instead. Following Willi Stoph's resignation on 13 November, four days after fall of the Berlin Wall, Modrow became Chairman of the Council of Ministers (Premier). On 1 December, the SED gave up its "leading role," formally ending communist rule in East Germany. Krenz resigned two days later. With the SED having given up its monopoly of power, Modrow, as Premier and the top state (rather than party) official, became leader of the country more or less by default. In any event, the SED Politburo, until then the top leadership body, was in disarray, leaving Modrow as the only person with a viable claim to power outside the imploding SED structure.

Seeking to defuse growing pressure to dissolve the Ministry of State Security, Modrow arranged for its renaming to the "Office for National Security" (Amt für Nationale Sicherheit – AfNS) on 17 November. A second rebranding as the "Office for the Protection of the Constitution of the GDR" (Verfassungsschutz der DDR) failed due to public and opposition pressure; the AfNS/Stasi was disbanded on 13 January 1990. The Modrow government gave orders to destroy incriminating Stasi files.

On 7 December, Modrow's government agreed at the Round Table to hold free elections in May 1990. Modrow and the Round Table agreed on 28 January to bring the elections forward to 18 March. By this time, the SED had added "Party of Democratic Socialism" to its name; this became its sole name in February. Some of the left-wing Round Table groups opposed Helmut Kohl's conservative government in the West, and worked with Modrow to arrest the pace of unification with West Germany. Swift reunification had popular support, however, and Modrow's stance was untenable.

On 5 February, Modrow appointed eight opposition ministers without portfolio to his cabinet. On 13 February, Modrow met with West German Chancellor Helmut Kohl, asking for an emergency loan of 15 billion DM to stabilize the collapsing Eastern economy, which was rejected by Kohl. Modrow remained premier until the formation of the De Maizière cabinet in April following elections in which the PDS placed third. The PDS had already ejected Honecker, Krenz, and other Communist-era leaders in February.

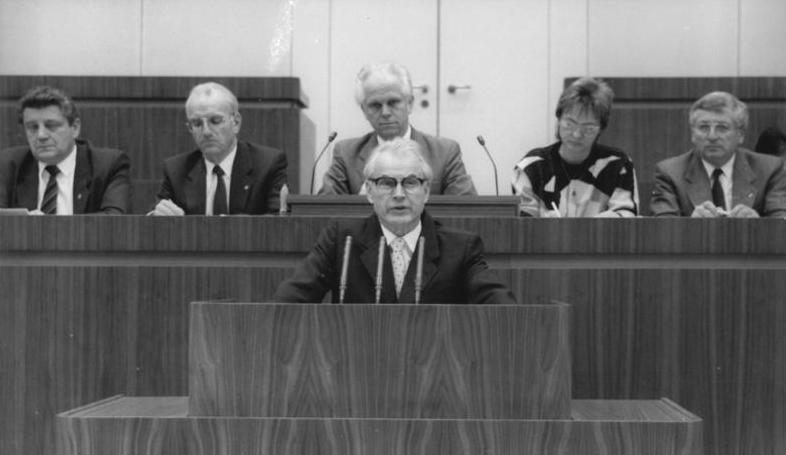
Modrow addressing the Volkskammer, 17 November 1989

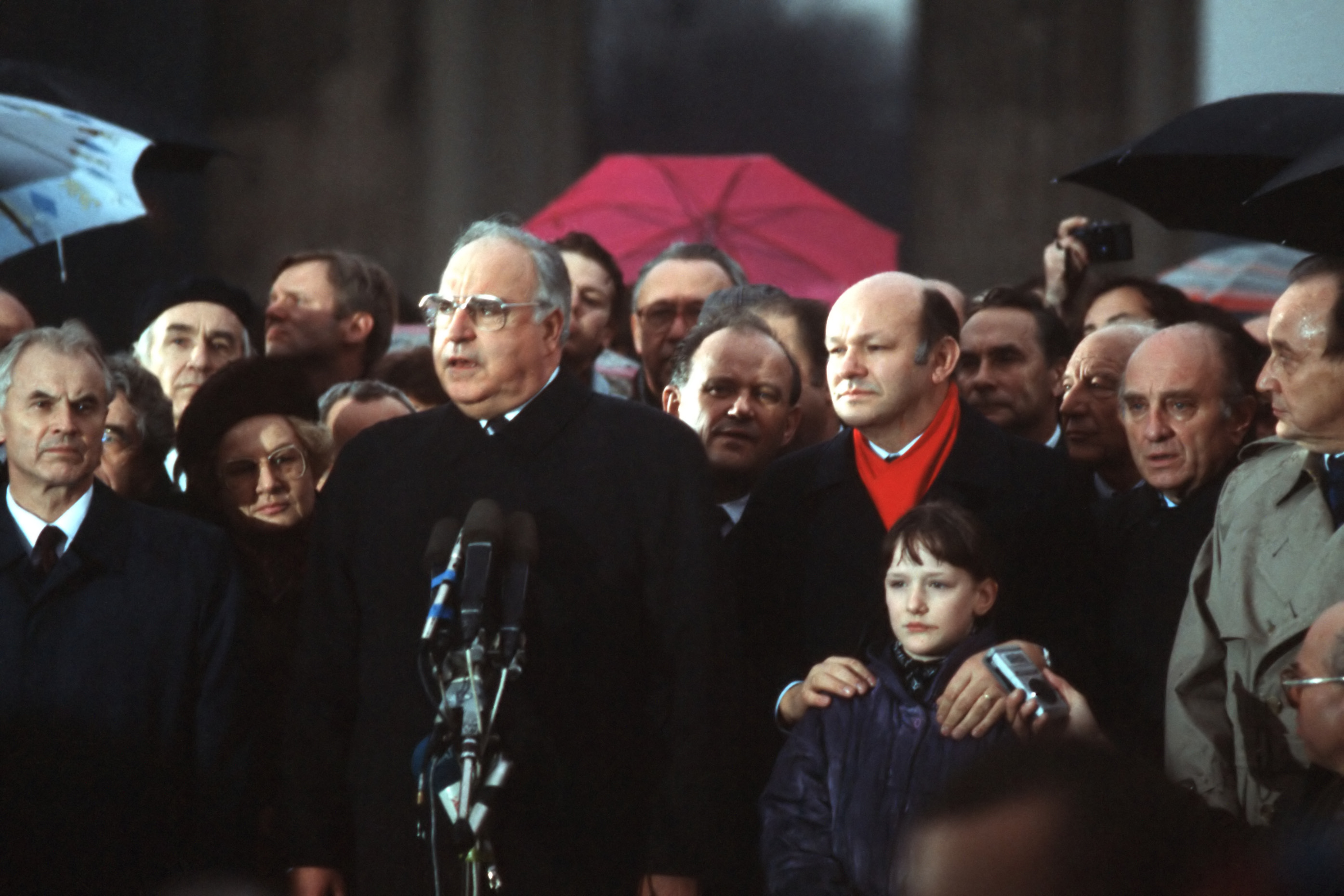
Modrow with West German Chancellor Helmut Kohl during the opening of the Brandenburg Gate, 22 December 1989

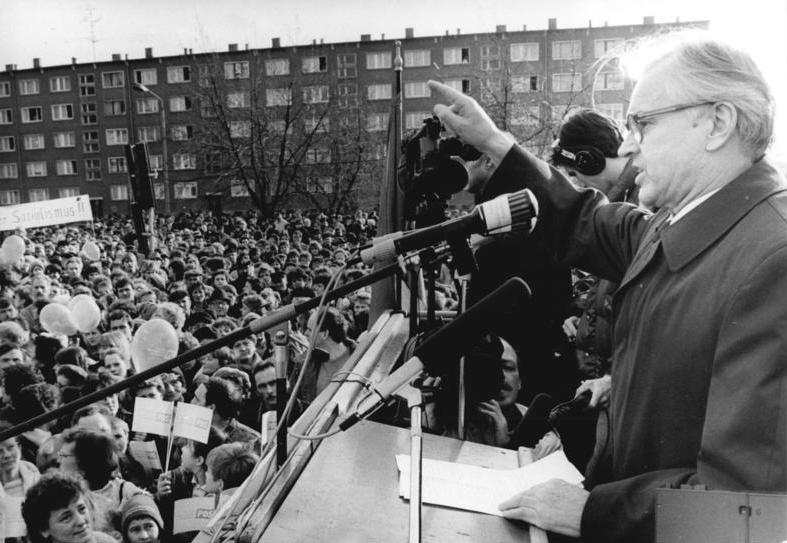
Modrow giving a speech at a rally in Demmin, 13 March 1990

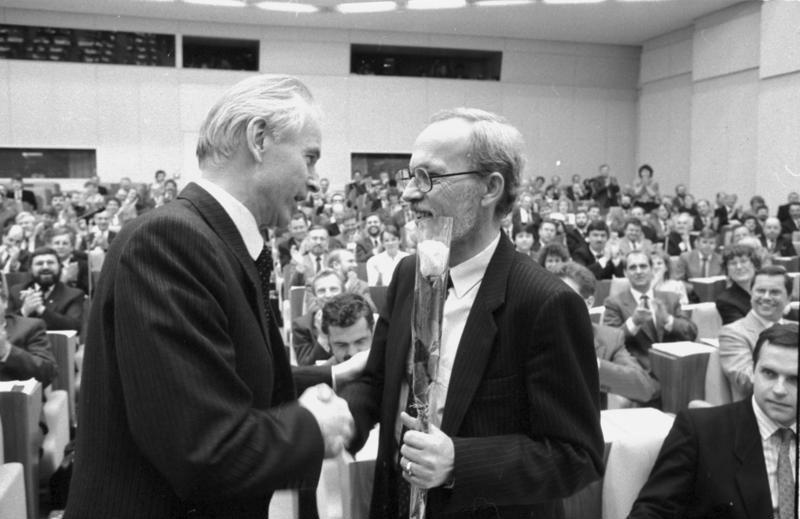
Modrow congratulating his successor, Lothar de Maizière, on his election as Minister-President, 12 April 1990

== Criminal sentence ==
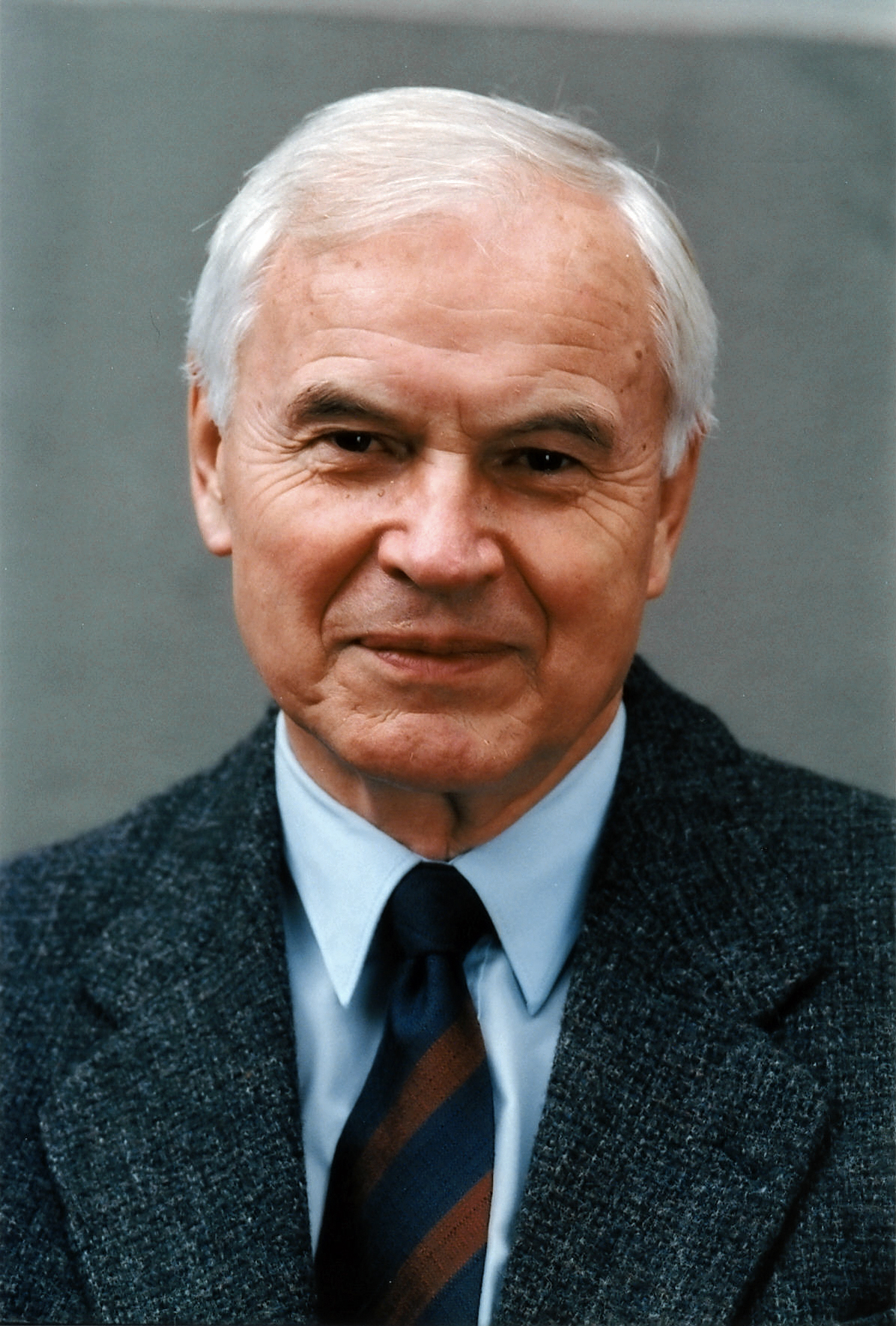
Modrow in 1999

On 27 May 1993, the Dresden District Court found Modrow guilty of electoral fraud committed in the May 1989 Dresden local elections, specifically, understating the percentage of voters who refused to vote for the official slate. The judge declined to impose a prison sentence or a fine. The Dresden District Court revoked the decision in August 1995 and Modrow was sentenced to nine months on probation. Modrow did not directly deny the charges, but argued that the trial was politically motivated and that the court lacked jurisdiction for crimes committed in East Germany. "We were all members of a political system," he said, speaking to the court in Dresden. "Some perhaps had the good fortune not to come into contact with manipulation, while others could not or were not allowed to turn away."

== Later life and death ==
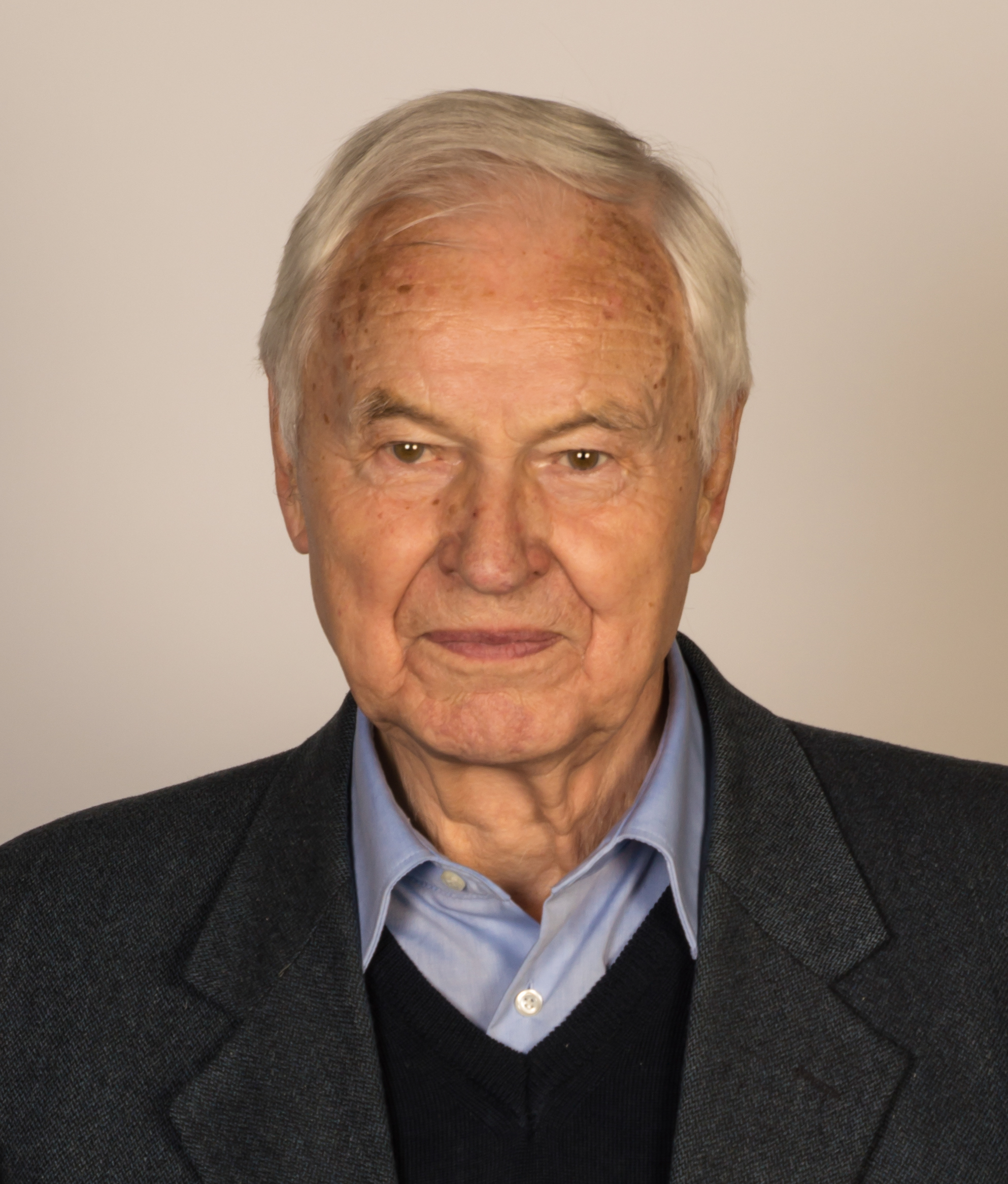
Modrow in 2014

After German reunification, Modrow served as a member of the Bundestag (1990–1994) and of the European Parliament (1999–2004). After leaving office, he wrote a number of books on his political experiences, his continued Marxist political views, and his disappointment at the dissolution of the Eastern Bloc. Although a supporter of Gorbachev's reforms in the 1980s, after the fall of Communism he criticised them for weakening the Eastern Bloc's economy. In 2006, he suggested both West Germany and East Germany were responsible for the killings of East Germans by the communist regime at the Berlin Wall, and later defended the construction of the wall as a necessary measure to prevent a war over West Berlin. He also called East Germany an "effective democracy". He was criticised for maintaining contacts with Neo-Stalinist groups. In 2018, he sued the Federal Intelligence Service for access to West German intelligence files on him from the Cold War. In 2019 he criticised the enlargement of NATO, which he also opposed reunified Germany's membership in. Modrow died on 10 February 2023, aged 95. He is buried at Dorotheenstadt Cemetery.

== Citations ==
Political offices
Preceded by Willi Stoph	Chairman of the Council of Ministers of the German Democratic Republic; 1989–1990	Succeeded by Lothar de Maizière
