= Hermann Axen =

German politician (1916–1992)

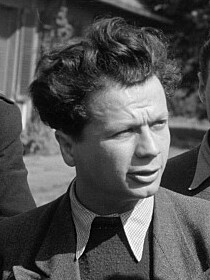
- Axen in 1946

Editor-in-chief of Neues Deutschland
- In office July 1956 – 18 February 1966
- Deputy: Eberhard Heinrich; Hajo Herbell; Günter Kertzscher; Harri Czepuck; Walter Florath
- Preceded by: Georg Stibi
- Succeeded by: Rudolf Singer

Second Secretary of the Socialist Unity Party in Berlin
- In office July 1953 – July 1956
- First Secretary: Alfred Neumann
- Preceded by: Erich Hönisch
- Succeeded by: Willi Kuhn
Parliamentary constituencies
Member of the Volkskammer for Cottbus-Stadt, Cottbus-Land, Calau, Forst, Guben, Spremberg (Berlin; 1954–1963)
In office 17 October 1954 – 16 November 1989
| Preceded by | Multi-member district |
| Succeeded by | Petra Gündel |
Member of the German People's Council
In office 18 March 1948 – 30 May 1949
| Preceded by | Constituency established |
| Succeeded by | Multi-member district |

Central Committee Secretariat (Note: Party Executive Committee until July 1950.) responsibilities
- 1985–1989: International Politics and Economics
- 1979–1989: Foreign Information
- 1977–1984: General Department
- 1966–1989: International Relations
- 1949–1953: Mass Agitation and Press

Personal details
- Born: 6 March 1916 Leipzig, Kingdom of Saxony, German Empire (now Saxony, Germany)
- Died: 15 February 1992 (aged 75) Berlin, Germany
- Resting place: Zentralfriedhof Friedrichsfelde
- Party: KPD (1932–1946); SED (1946–1989); Independent (after 1989)
- Spouse: Sonja
- Children: 2
- Occupation: Politician; Civil Servant; Party Clerk; Merchant
- Central institution membership: 1970–1989: Full member, Politburo of the Central Committee; 1963–1970: Candidate member, Politburo of the Central Committee; 1949–1989: Full member, Central Committee; Other offices held: 1962–1989: Head, Foreign Policy Commission at the Politburo; 1963–1971: Member, Commission for Agitation and Propaganda at the Politburo; 1963–1967: Member, East Berlin City Council

Hermann Axen (6 March 1916 – 15 February 1992) was a German communist politician who held several high-ranking positions in the Socialist Unity Party between 1949 and 1989. He became involved in the German resistance to Nazi rule, spending much of that time in state detention, including Auschwitz. After the war he became a prominent politician in the Soviet occupation zone, reorganized in 1949 as the German Democratic Republic (East Germany). He served as a relatively high-profile member of the powerful Politburo of the Central Committee between 1970 and 1989.

In November 1989, Axen visited Moscow for eye surgery. While he was away, the entire Politburo (of which he was a member) resigned on 8 November 1989, and he too was excluded from it. On his return in January 1990 he was arrested, suspected of corruption and abuse of public office. This dramatic reversal of fortune came during a period of rapid political change. At the time of his death the arrest warrant had been rescinded and the case against him remained unproven, the necessary investigations having been delayed or suspended in response to his declining health.

== Life ==
=== Provenance and early years ===
Hermann Axen was born in Leipzig. His father worked as a sales representative. His schooling took him to the Realgymnasium which in the eyes of British historian David Childs made him a "grammar school boy". His family background was evidently an intellectual one: a source mentions his father's large private library. The family adhered to the liberal branch of Judaism and he received a Bar Mitzvah. A year later he horrified his parents by renouncing religion. Two years after that (and less than a year before the Nazi take-over), influenced by his brother Rudolf, he joined the Young Communists.

=== Nazi Germany ===
He was affected by his brother's murder by the Gestapo which took place, following torture, at the main police station in Dresden on 23 September 1933. Rudolf's body was promptly handed over to his parents following the killing. According to a personal "curriculum vitae" compiled by Axen in 1949 and later found in his "party file", his parents were killed by the Nazis after 1939/40 in "the ghetto" or concentration camp near Lviv/Lemberg. The coming to power of the Nazis at the start of 1933 had been followed by a rapid transition to one-party dictatorship which meant that any political activity outside the Nazi Party, and in particular political activity on behalf of the banned Communist Party, became illegal. Rudolf Axen, until his killing, was leader of the underground Communist group in East Saxony. Axen undertook a course at the Marxist Workers' Academy ("Marxistische Arbeiterschule" / "MASch") in Leipzig during 1932/33 after which he took on a leadership role in the youth section in the party's Leipzig subdistrict ("Unterbezirk Leipzig"). As a seventeen year old, in Nazi Germany he served, in the words of one admiring source, as an illegal resistance worker, a "party instructor" and a party contact ("Verbindungsmann") in Saxony.

Between March and November 1934 he undertook and completed a commercial apprenticeship with Hoffner, Moses & Co., a fur trading company. By June 1934 he was also responsible for agitation and propaganda ("Agitprop") for the local leadership for Leipzig-West of the underground Young Communists, identified among comrades by the code names "Max" and, subsequently, "Friedrich". In September 1934 he joined the Young Communists' Leipzig region leadership team ("Bezirksleitung"). The group had by this point been effectively destroyed through arrests, and Axen now teamed up with a fellow young communist called Heinz Mißlitz to try and rebuild it.

Axen was arrested, along with fourteen comrades, on 3 November 1934. He now presented himself as a Polish citizen and a disciple of the "Mosaic religious community". His papers were sufficiently convincing for the arrest to prompt an intervention by the Polish consulate in Leipzig. On 20 June 1935 he faced the district high court in Dresden. The charge was the usual one of "preparing to commit high treason" ("Vorbereitung zum Hochverrat"). He was convicted and sentenced to a three-year jail term which he served in the old penitentiary at Zwickau. He had already served seven months of his sentence while in pre-trial investigatory detention, and he was accordingly released in November 1937. Possibly on account of having presented himself to the authorities as a Polish citizen three years earlier, but possibly simply on account of his Communist activism and his Jewish family provenance, by this time he had been stripped of any residual German citizenship rights, and his release was made conditional on his immediately leaving the country.

=== French exile ===
Now stateless, and with the agreement of the party, he at once headed for Vienna, following a route which involved travelling via Poland. By this time, however, it was no secret that the German leader, backed on this point by widespread popular support in Germany and, more importantly, Austria, saw the independent Austrian state as an anomaly: with "Anschluss" looming ever larger on the horizon, in January 1938 Axen fled to Paris which since 1933, had served informally as one of two headquarter locations for the German Communist Party in exile. For the next couple of years, till 1940, he took casual work, employed in a support capacity in a range of businesses, while at the same time undertaking courier jobs for members of the illegal German Communist Party leadership. From April 1938 he was taking on "Red Aid" jobs for the (German) Young Communists. He also undertook translation jobs for "German Freedom Radio 29.8" ("Deutsche Freiheitssender 29,8").

From a Paris perspective the Second World War broke out in September 1939, when the German army invaded Poland and the French and British governments reacted by declaring war on Germany, but on the streets of Paris little changed till May 1940 when the Germans rapidly over-ran northern France. The authorities responded (as in England) by summarily identifying a large number of German political and race refugees from Nazism as enemy aliens and interning them, in the first instance, in a large Paris football stadium and subsequently in the Drancy internment camp. Possibly in connection with his legal stateless status, Axen avoided this fate and managed to escape to the southern half of France where a puppet government had been established under the leadership of the World War I hero Philippe Pétain. However, still in May 1940 he was identified as a "stateless communist", arrested and interned in Camp Vernet, a vast holding camp in the mountains to the west of Perpignan, previously used to house returning fighters from the Spanish Civil War. In June 1940 the authorities reassigned the camp which was now to be used to accommodate "all foreigners considered suspect or dangerous to the public order". By the end of May 1940 it is estimated that Axen was one of at least 250 of the Camp Vernet inmates who were German-speaking political exiles, and the two years he spent at the camp afforded significant networking opportunities with men some of whom would become leading members of the political establishment in the German Democratic Republic after 1949.

=== Concentration camps ===
Over the next couple of years the Vichy government was increasingly marginalised, and by 1942 Gestapo officers were a regular sight on the streets of the cities in southern France. Security at Vernet no longer relied simply on its extremely remote location, and the camp was being described as a holding centre for Jewish families awaiting deportation to Nazi labour and extermination camps. In August 1942 Axen and various other internees picked out as Jewish communists, including Kurt Goldstein were handed over to the Gestapo, sent to the Paris area and placed on "Convoy 18 (12 August 1942)", one of the trains which, since March of that year, had been rolling across to Auschwitz-Birkenau in Silesia. He was held for more than two days at the main Auschwitz-Birkenau camp before being allocated to a sub-camp at Jawischowitz (as it was known to the Germans) where for more than two years he was set to work underground in the coal mines. It is recorded in sources that here he was a leader of the illegal camp committee.

At least one source warns that as Axen rose in the East German political and media hierarchies, his role during his time in the Nazi concentration camp system was often exaggerated retrospectively. For the fifteenth edition of his "autobiography" a ghost writer presented a scene that involved Axen, armed with a machine pistol, storming an SS watch-tower: this is believed to be fiction. Manfred Uschner worked closely with Axen during the 1960s and 1970s, and described Axen the concentration camp inmate as "very cool and reserved". "In the concentration camp, as a relatively young comrade, he played no significant role, or at least not a strikingly positive one".

Auschwitz concentration camp was emptied of its internees, as the Red army advanced from the east, in January 1945 and Axen was among the survivors transferred to Buchenwald near Weimar. Sources assert that he was a member of the illegal Communist Party leadership team in the concentration camp. As the war neared its end, in April 1945 it was US troops that liberated Axen from the Buchenwald camp.

=== Soviet occupation zone ===
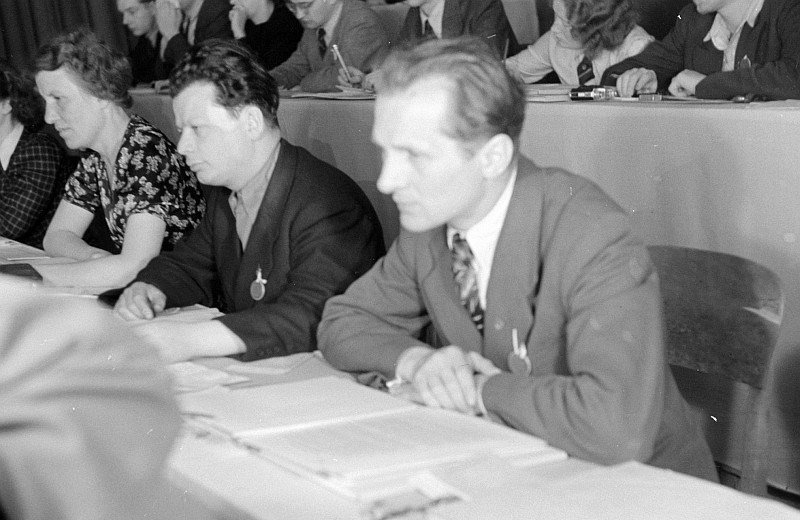
Axen (left) alongside Erich Honecker (right) at the 2nd Parliament of the Free German Youth in Meissen, May 1947

Although the region of central southern Germany that included both Buchenwald and Axen's home city of Leipzig was liberated by US forces, the victorious allies had already agreed a postwar territorial division of Germany whereby the entire central portion of the country would be administered as the Soviet occupation zone. The Americans pulled their troops back to the agreed lines on their maps in July 1945, and by August 1945 Axen had been installed as Head of the Youth Committee with the appointed city council of Soviet-administered Leipzig and as a member of the regional leadership team ("Kreisleitung") of the local Communist Party. Between October 1945 and February 1946 he was Head of the Youth Committee for the entire Saxony region. In April 1946 he was one of thousands of Communist Party members who lost no in signing their party membership over to the newly formed Socialist Unity Party ("Sozialistische Einheitspartei Deutschlands" / SED). The SED was formed through a contentious merger of the Communist Party and the less Moscow oriented Social Democratic Party. Its promoters may have hoped that the merger would take effect across Germany, but in the event it was only possible obtain the support necessary for it to take effect in the Soviet occupation zone, where the SED quickly emerged as the permanent ruling party in a new kind of German one-party dictatorship. For Axen 1946 was also the year in which he co-founded the "Anti-Fascist youth committee" ("antifaschistische Jugendausschuß"). Of greater long-term importance was his role as co-founder, together with Paul Verner und Erich Honecker of the Free German Youth ("Freie Deutsche Jugend" / FDJ), which very quickly became, in effect, the youth wing of the ruling SED. Between March 1946 and February 1949 he served as secretary to the FDJ National Council ("Zentralrat").

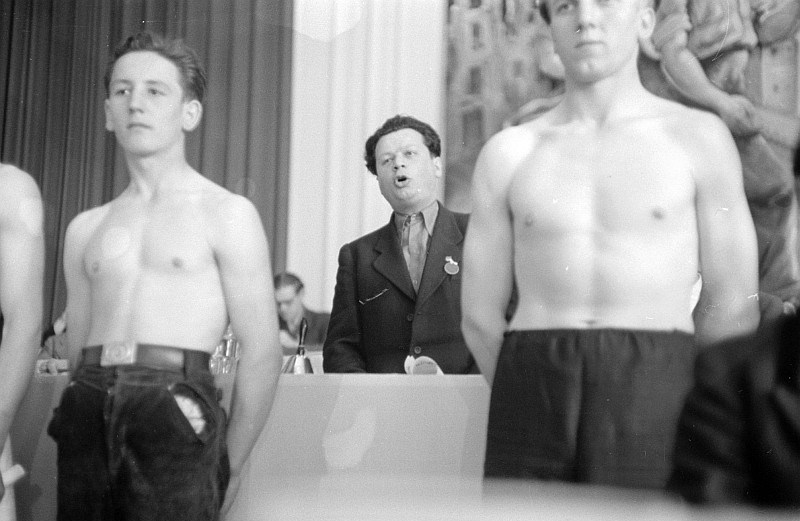
Axen speaks before the 2nd Parliament of the Free German Youth in Meissen, May 1947

In 1948 he became a member of the People's Council (" Deutscher Volksrat"), a precursor parliament set up in the Soviet occupation zone and mandated to develop/endorse a constitution for the new Germany, based on a draft document issued by the ruling SED (party) three years earlier. In 1949/50 the "Volksrat" gave way to the People's Chamber ("Volkskammer"), a form of national parliament: at this point Axen was not a member. In 1954, however, he became a member of the "Volkskammer", holding one of the 17 seats allocated for SED members representing the Greater Berlin region. In 1971 he took over from Rudolf Agsten as chair of the parliamentary foreign affairs committee. Axen remained a member of the "Volkskammer" till 16 November 1989, when his parliamentary mandate was revoked "by a resolution of the party Volkskammer group" ("Mandatsniederlegung nach Fraktionsbeschluss ").

=== German Democratic Republic ===
In October 1949 the Soviet occupation zone was relaunched as the Soviet sponsored German Democratic Republic (East Germany). In practice the new country's constitutional arrangements followed not the written constitution formally proclaimed in October 1949 but a Leninist constitutional model. (A new written constitution, endorsed by referendum in 1968, would in most respects belatedly align the de jure and de facto positions.) Under the highly centralised Leninist constitutional structure, power flowed not from any national parliament nor indeed from government ministries. Power rested with the Central Committee of the ruling party. Key decisions were taken in the Central Committee Politburo which for most purposes was dominated by the First Secretary/General Secretary of the party. The extent to which the Central Committee monopolised political power was blurred to the extent that leading Central Committee members were often also, concurrently or successively, members of the Volkskammer and/or government ministers. Axen became a member of the Party Executive ("Partei Vorstand") in 1949, and he remained an important member as it quickly evolved into the Central Committee. Reflecting his interests and abilities, from 1949 he was in charge of the Central Committee's agitation and propaganda ("Agitprop") department. Between March 1949 and July 1953 he served as Central Committee Secretary with special responsibility for Mass Agitation and Press matters.

One important task undertaken by the Central Committee's Agitprop chief involved radio transmissions originating in the Soviet occupation zone which he quickly and effectively reconfigured (or, in the words of at least one source, "purged") in 1949, introducing a consistency of editorial focus to ensure that broadcasts followed the ruling party line. A large number of senior managers were dismissed from the broadcasters' offices in Berlin, to be replaced by comrades who could be better trusted to conform. Sources also refer to the presence by 1950, of Central Committee "spies" among broadcasting staff

The June 1953 uprising alarmed the East German leadership more than was apparent at the time. East German news broadcasts played down the wave of violently suppressed strikes and street protests, but many listeners in and close to Berlin were also able to listen to radio reports transmitted from West Berlin and received a different set of reports. The Central Committee's "Agitprop" secretary felt unable to pretend that nothing was happening, but his public response concentrated on the western broadcasts: he was able to deliver a suitably reassuring statement that the Soviet government would intervene with the western powers, and with its agents "roll up the whole West Berlin problem". Within days a major exercise in blame allocation followed, accompanied by sackings and demotions within the government. Those whom Walter Ulbricht mistrusted least tended to be those who, like him, had spent the Nazi years exiled in Moscow. That Axen had chosen to flee not to Moscow but to Paris back in 1938 had avoided the risk of being caught up in Stalin's purges, but fifteen years later it meant that while the country was led by Walter Ulbricht, Axen would never be a complete political insider. It was also self-evident that the events of June 1953 had represented a major "Agitprop" failure. Axen shared the responsibility for failing to curb the effectiveness of the ideological counter-offensive and the popularisation of the vernacular of the "Fascist Putsch". Axen retained his membership of the Central Committee, but he was stripped of his special secretarial responsibilities within it. Perhaps "election" to the Volkskammer in 1954 represented a consolation. He was also appointed, in succession to Erich Hönisch, Second Secretary to the regional party leadership team ("SED-Bezirksleitung") for Berlin in July 1953. Since Berlin had been the focus of street protests the previous month, it may well have been thought that Axen's "Agitprop" experience would have been of value, but sources nevertheless present this appointment as a significant demotion.

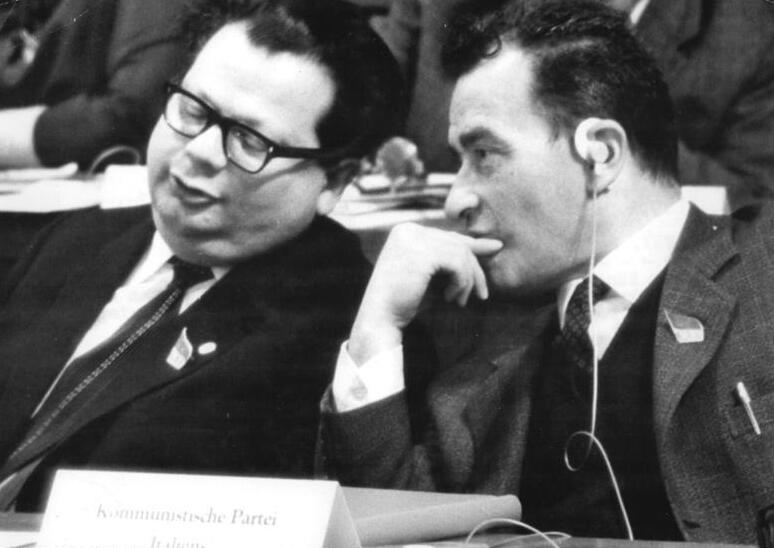
Axen (left) and PCI Politburo member Pietro Ingrao (right) at the 7th Party Congress of the Socialist Unity Party in East Berlin, 18 April 1967

In July 1956 he left his position with the party administration in Berlin as his career moved on. He was now appointed managing editor of Neues Deutschland, the party newspaper, and by far the most widely available daily newspaper in East Germany. He succeeded Georg Stibi in the editorial position. Stibli had been in post only since the previous year, but Axen remained managing editor till 1966. His ten years tenure in charge at the newspaper was the longest of any Neues Deutschland managing editor in the twentieth century. In September 1956 he was awarded the Patriotic Order of Merit, indicating unambiguously that he was back in favour with the party. Further national awards followed over the next ten years. In addition, he served as a Berlin city councillor between 1963 and 1967.

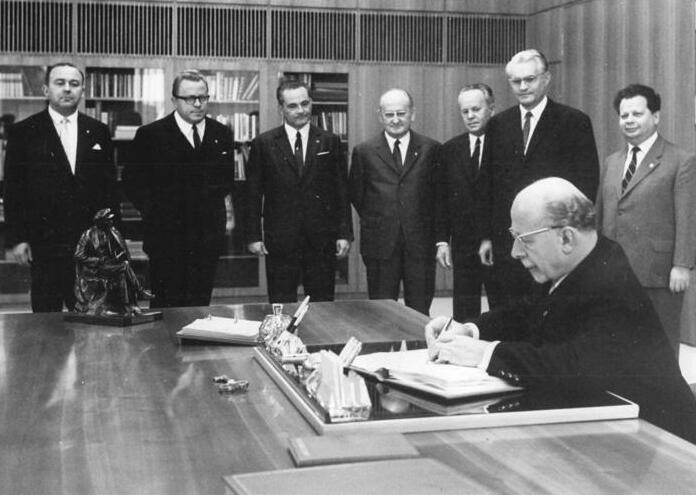
Axen (far right) looks on as Walter Ulbricht signs the Treaty on the Non-Proliferation of Nuclear Weapons, 29 September 1969

Having never lost his place in the Party Central Committee, in 1966 Axen was appointed Central Committee secretary for International Relations which made him, according to at least one source, the principal architect of East German foreign policy. His mandate also included matters involving the international communist and labour movements. He had been made a candidate for Politburo membership in January 1963, and in 1970, finally, he was elected to full membership, filling the vacancy arising through the illness and death of Paul Fröhlich.

In 1970 politburo members enjoyed a ringside seat in an increasingly frantic power struggle between the country's leader, Walter Ulbricht, and a would-be successor, second party secretary Erich Honecker. Ulbricht was now in his mid-seventies, and when he dismissed Honecker from his party post he was immediately forced to reverse his position. The younger man enjoyed the backing of the Soviet leader, Leonid Brezhnev. It was only in May 1971 that the Soviets forced the resignation of Walter Ulbricht, but during 1970 it became increasingly clear that Erich Honecker represented the future.

Axen and Erich Honecker had worked closely together in the later 1940s on the launch of the FDJ. They remained close friends, and during the period from 1971 to 1989, as he exercised his Politburo responsibilities for international relations, Axen's natural confidence in his interpersonal skills and intellectual abilities was matched by a political confidence that the leadership would always respect and usually follow his judgements, especially during the first decade or so after 1970. To commentators more familiar with western European government structures than with the party-focused model applied in countries under strong Soviet influence, it is noteworthy that in the German Democratic Republic under Honecker, Axen had far more power over East German foreign policy than Otto Winzer or Oskar Fischer, who served as Ministers for Foreign Affairs respectively from 1965 till 1975 and from 1975 till 1990, but neither of whom ever made it to the Politburo. Between November 1976 and 1989 Axen was a member of the politburo's "West Germany Working Group" ("Arbeitsgruppe BRD").

Throughout his political career, Axen spoke at the National Memorial of the GDR at celebrations commemorating the liberation of Buchenwald concentration camp.

=== Honecker years ===
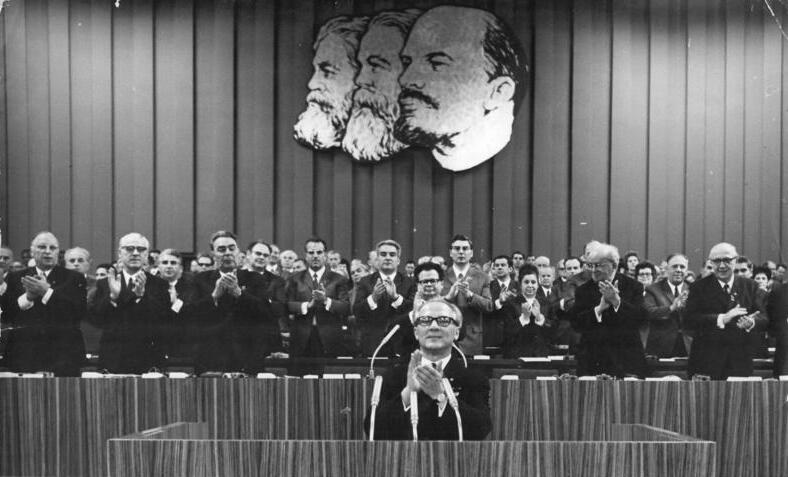
Axen (directly behind Honecker) applauds Erich Honecker at the 8th Party Congress of the Socialist Unity Party in East Berlin, 15 June 1971. Also present is Leonid Brezhnev (third from left).

The relationship with West Germany was particularly important for the East German leadership, partly for reasons of shared history, language and culture, but also on account of shared interests between the two states. There was, in addition, a growing economic interdependency during the later 1980s. Axen was responsible for talks on disarmament that took place between East Germany's ruling SED (party) and West Germany's SPD (party) (which headed up that country's governing coalition between 1969 and 1982). He laid the diplomatic and practical groundwork for Erich Honecker's visits to the west, on which he would accompany his leader.

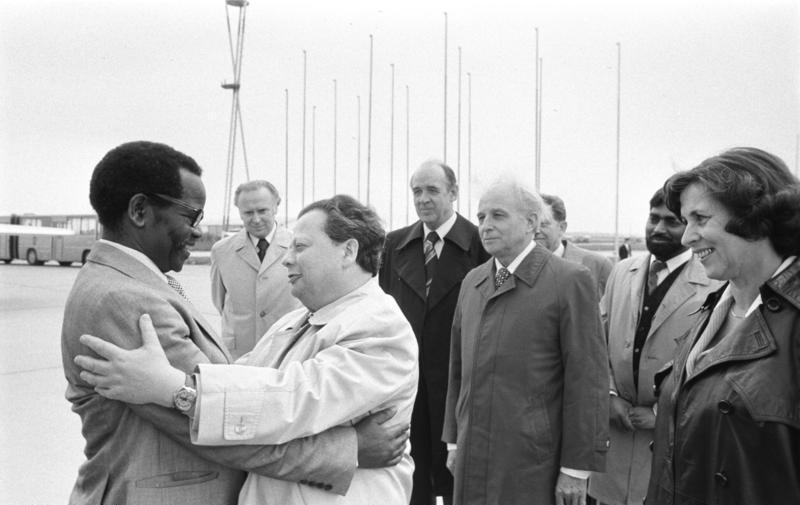
Axen greets an ANC delegation led by Oliver Tambo in East Berlin, 15 May 1978

From the standpoint of interested observers, Hermann Axen stood out from the mainstream of East German politicians. In East Germany he was known both for his diminutive (and increasingly plump) form and as an exceptionally able and experienced foreign policy operator. From his days in "Agitprop" and his ten-year editorship of Neues Deutschland he was respected as the "undisputed number one" when it came to thoughtful and effective mass communication. Western intelligence, meanwhile, saw him as "very pleasant", a polite and humorous individual completely unlike most members of the East German politburo. He was fluent not just in Russian, but also in French and English. He came across as something of an intellectual: he liked, on occasion, to quote Shakespeare.

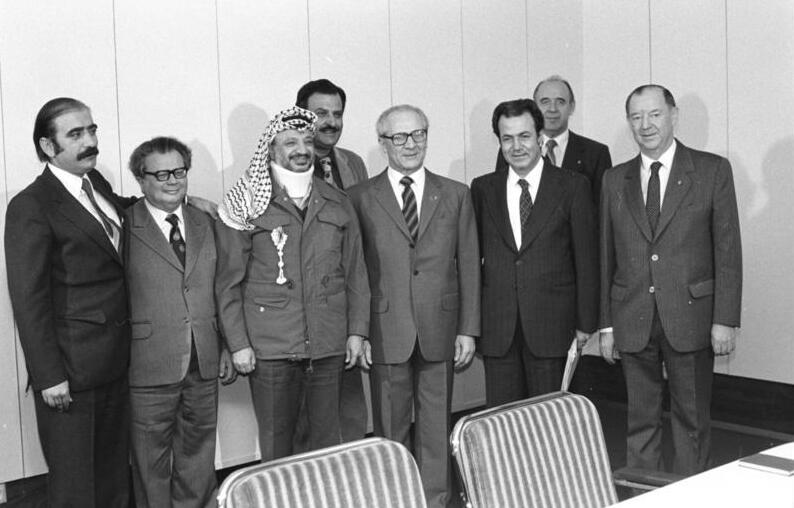
Axen (second from left) and other SED officials greet Yasser Arafat (third from left) in East Berlin, 29 December 1980

Western intelligence also believed that he enjoyed the complete confidence of Erich Honecker, both on questions of foreign policy and in matters of [socialist] ideology and theory. Intelligence analysts speculated that the close relationahip between the two men went back to their shared experiences: they had both served time in prison under the Nazis. They had started their party careers at the birth of the German Democratic Republic with their shared work on creating the FDJ). However, western analysts also received reports from their informants that Axen suffered from an inferiority complex, that he was short and by this time fat, with terrible eye-sight. He suffered from Diabetes and high blood pressure, and had been fitted with a heart pace-maker. There was speculation that this might have been behind reports to the effect that he was particularly considerate in looking after subordinates who were unwell and/or getting on in years.

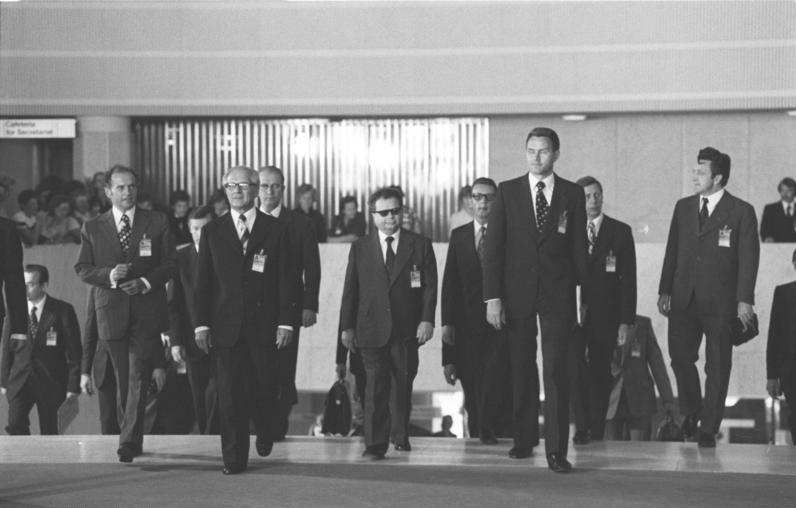
Erich Honecker (second from left), flanked by Oskar Fischer (far left) and Axen (third from left), arrive at Finlandia Hall in Helsinki for the third phase of the CSCE, 30 July 1975

Axen was in the team that accompanied Erich Honecker to Helsinki in 1975 for the conference that delivered the Helsinki Accords. He served between 1981 and 1989 as a member of the politburo's "Commission for coordinating economic, cultural and technical-scientific relations with the countries of Asia, Africa and the Arabic region. He served on the presidium of the East German Peace Council between 1982 and 1989.

=== Arrest, illness and death ===
Axen was arrested on 16 January 1990 at Berlin airport, as he arrived on a flight from Moscow. He was held on suspicion of corruption and abuse of office. His bank accounts, which he shared with his wife, were blocked. The arrest warrant was rescinded on 31 January 1990, however, because of his failing health. After reunification the Berlin district court rejected an application by the state prosecutor to re-open the case on 27 June 1991. The prosecutor appealed the decision, but the application had still not been heard on 15 February 1992 when Axen died of heart failure.

=== Holiday home ===
In 1986 Axen had a holiday home built. In 1993 a Berlin court determined that the house had been built on land that he did not own and partly paid for from public funds. The subsequent upkeep of the property was paid for out of public funds. Axen had indeed paid rent, but the amount of the rent paid had been nominal.

During the run-up to reunification, which formally took place in October 1990, holders of East German money were able to exchange their money for West German money at unrealistically favourable exchange rates. The arrangement was unpopular with West German central bankers, but was felt by the West German chancellor to be politically necessary. The first 4,000 Marks worth of an individual's savings could be converted at a rate of 1 for 1. Company debts and house loans were converted at the rate of 2 "East Marks" for each (western) Mark, while so-called "speculative money" was converted at a rate of 3:1. It therefore became important to be able to identify where money came from before converting it. During the "conversion period" Axen applied to convert a quarter of a million East Marks. The provenance of the money was declared to be as "regular income".

In March 1990 East Germany had held its first (and last) free and fair general election. This meant that during the seven months between March 1990 and reunification the East German parliament ("Volkskammer") was no longer the creature of the ruling SED (party). In July 1990 a parliamentary "ad hoc select committee", mandated to provide the necessary oversight, asked Axen to prove that the money he was seeking to convert had been acquired lawfully. (They asked Erich Honecker to provide similar proof in respect of the slightly smaller amount that he had applied to convert.) In the event the parliamentary committee only investigated conversion applications from senior East German politicians, but a Berlin court subsequently decided that the committee had simply focused on the largest amounts for which application to convert had been submitted: the high value applications were indeed restricted to senior members of the SED (party), but that should not be imputed to political motives on the part of committee members.

In September 1990 the select committee, still not persuaded that Axen's savings had been lawfully acquired, ordered the confiscation of the monies in his relevant bank accounts. The committee gave as its reason that Axen had abused his office to benefit himself, applying self-conferred privileges and through transactions that grossly violated moral standards, in order to advantage himself and others, to the detriment of the national budget and other public funds ("...durch Missbrauch seiner Funktionen durch Inanspruchnahme von selbstbestätigten Privilegien und durch Handlungen, die einen gröblichen Verstoss gegen die guten Sitten darstellen, sich und anderen persönliche Vorteile zum Nachteil der Gesellschaft und zu Lasten des Staatshaushalts und anderer gesellschaftlicher Fonds verschafft hat."). The Axens lodged an appeal, but this was heard only in May 1993. The court upheld the judgement of the parliamentary select committee. Sonja Axen appealed that decision on behalf of the family, and in the end the case came to be heard by the European Court of Human Rights, where it was effectively joined with a broadly similar appeal being pursued by Margot Honecker. (Erich Honecker had died of liver cancer in 1994.). The appeals failed, however.

== Personal ==
Axen appears to have married his wife, Sonja, in the later 1940s. The year of her birth is given as 1925 and she worked, during the East German period, as a contributing editor with Bummi, a monthly publication intended for small children, launched in 1957 and named after its leading character, a teddy bear. There are references to her having been a victim of Nazi persecution, like her husband, but further details are not provided.

Their two daughters were born in 1950 and 1953.

== Selected works ==
- Über die Fragen der fortschrittlichen deutschen Filmkunst. Berlin 1952.
- Aktuelle Fragen der internationalen Beziehungen der Sozialistischen Einheitspartei Deutschlands und der Deutschen Demokratischen Republik. Dietz-Verlag, Berlin 1965.
- Zu ideologischen Problemen des XXIII. Parteitages der KPdSU. Dietz-Verlag, Berlin 1966.
- Zur internationalen Lage und zur Entwicklung des Kräfteverhältnisses. Dietz-Verlag, Berlin 1967.
- Aus dem Bericht über die Ergebnisse der Internationalen Beratung der Kommunistischen und Arbeiterparteien in Moskau. Dietz-Verlag, Berlin 1969.
- Sozialismus und revolutionärer Weltprozeß. Ausgewählte Reden und Aufsätze. Dietz-Verlag, Berlin 1976
- Starker Sozialismus – sicherer Frieden. Ausgewählte Reden und Aufsätze. Dietz-Verlag, Berlin 1981
- Aus dem Bericht des Politbüros an die 5. Tagung des ZK der SED. Dietz-Verlag, Berlin 1982
- Kampf um den Frieden – Schlüsselfrage der Gegenwart. Ausgewählte Reden und Aufsätze. Dietz-Verlag, Berlin 1986
- Ich war ein Diener der Partei. Autobiographische Gespräche. editited by Harald Neubert. Edition Ost, Berlin 1996.

== Awards and honours (selection) ==
- 1958 Medal for Fighters Against Fascism
- 1960 Banner of Labor
- 1965 Hero of Labour
- 1966 Patriotic Order of Merit in gold
- 1985 Jubilee Medal "Forty Years of Victory in the Great Patriotic War 1941–1945" (Soviet award)
- 1986 Order of Friendship of Peoples (Soviet award)
