= Alfred Benjamin =

- Born: 8 January 1911; Elberfeld, Elberfeld, German Empire
- Died: September 1942 (aged 31); France
- Occupation: Communist activist
- Spouse: Dora Davidsohn (1913-1999)

Alfred Benjamin (8 January 1911 – September 1942) was a German bank employee who became a Communist activist. He was obliged to emigrate and in 1935 was in France where after 1940 he joined the French Resistance. He died in an accident during the late summer of 1942 while attempting to escape from collaborationist France to Switzerland.

== Biography ==
Alfred Benjamin was born in Elberfeld, then a rapidly growing industrial town, today part of Wuppertal. His father was an ironmonger. The family identified as Jewish. Benjamin trained for work as a bank clerk. As a young man he studied Marxist texts and became aligned with the Labour movement, and in 1930, by which time he lived in Düsseldorf, he joined the Communist Party and the Federation of Independent Employees (Allgemeiner freier Angestelltenbund / AfA-Bund). In the aftermath of the World Economic Crisis he lost his job. However, he took on responsibility for political communication on behalf of the Communist Party in the Düsseldorf, targeting employees of the larger manufacturing businesses and distribution companies. He also founded a cabaret group called "Kolonne Stehkragen", himself writing the lyrics for most of their songs. In 1932 he received a prison sentence for distributing leaflets.

Two months after Germany's 1933 regime change, in March 1933 Alfred Benjamin was taken into what the new government termed Protective custody ("Schutzhaft") and interned in the "Ulmer Höhe" concentration camp, transferred later to the camp at Esterwegen, where he was held till October 1933. He was then detained in the Camp at Lichtenburg bei Torgau till December 1933 or December 1934 after which he was encouraged by the Gestapo to emigrate to Palestine. He initially rejected police requirements that he should emigrate and instead made contact with his comrades, to resume his political activities on behalf of the now illegal Communist Party. Threatened with further arrest, however, during or before Summer 1935, he was instructed by the party to emigrate to France where the German Communist Party had already established its exiled headquarters in Paris.

In September 1935 he was arrested by the French police after he had made an appearance at a trades union meeting in order to call for solidarity with the German socialist Alfred Kayser, who had recently been sentenced to death. It was only with difficulty that Benjamin avoided deportation to Spain following this incident. He nevertheless remained in France, and in 1936 started producing the news-sheet "Trait d’Union", which he used to inform French workers about the situation in Germany and the anti-Fascist resistance struggle. As well as this he worked as an editor for the (German language) Communist Party news-sheet "Frage und Antwort" ("Questions and answers").

In September 1939 both France and Britain declared war on Germany. It would be some months before it became clear what this would mean for Germany, but in the meantime, in both Paris and London, a large number of German political exiles who had emigrated to escape the Nazi government at home were identified as enemy aliens and arrested. Albert Benjamin was arrested and in October 1939 interned in the camp at Rieucros, close to the border with Spain. In February 1942 all the detainees who had been held at Riecros were transferred to a recently converted camp at Brens, near to Albi. By this time, on 22 February 1941, he had married Dora Davidsohn (following her second marriage known as Dora Schaul). The two had met in 1934, probably in Amsterdam, as two of many Jewish German Communist exiles looking for a new home. In 1935 they settled in Paris where he had been known to her as "Benn", and their arrest in 1939.

By August 1942 Albert Benjamin was being held at a labour camp at Chanac in central southern France. That was the month in which he managed to escape. The escape appeared timely because during the later summer of 1942 German and Polish Jews still held in southern France were being separated from the other detainees and deported to concentration camps outside France where as it turned out, many were later killed. Following his own escape both Albert Benjamin and his wife (who had escaped from a different internment camp a few weeks earlier) headed separately towards Switzerland. Benjamin died in an accident in eastern France before reaching Switzerland. Much of the available information on his life and death has survived only because of his widow's later determination to ensure that their story should never be lost.
