= Rieucros Camp =

French internment camp

Rieucros
- Concentration camp
- Location within France
- Coordinates: 44.5271°N 3.4819°E
- Location: Mende, Occitania, France
- Built by: French Third Republic
- Operated by: French Third Republic, Vichy France
- Original use: Camp for Spanish refugees
- Operational: to 13 February 1942
- Inmates: Former International Brigadiers, German opponents of Nazism, Italians, Eastern European Jews, Polish forced labourers; French female communists, anarchists and prostitutes
- Number of inmates: thousands
- Notable inmates: Ida Mett, Dora Schaul, Alexander Grothendieck, Michel del Castillo, Lenka Reinerová

The Rieucros Camp [ʁjø.kʁo] was an internment camp on a forested hillside near Mende in the French department of Lozère that operated from January 1939 to February 1942. Prime Minister Édouard Daladier established the camp by decree on January 21, 1939, to isolate members of the International Brigades from French society after the defeat of the Second Spanish Republic and subsequent exile, known as la Retirada, in the Spanish Civil War. Other "suspicious and undesirable foreign men," sometimes accused of common law crimes, were also interned. After France's entry into World War II, authorities transferred the men to the camp of le Vernet and began to intern "suspicious and undesirable foreign women" in October 1939. Following the Battle of France, Rieucros fell in the southern unoccupied zone and the Vichy regime assumed control of the camp from Third Republican authorities. In February 1942, authorities transferred the entire camp population of women and children to the camp of Brens.

== Background ==
In the late 1930s, the French Third Republic increasingly restricted immigration as increasing numbers of political refugees fled ascendant European dictatorships. Prime Minister Édouard Daladier of the Radical Party circumvented Parliament to issue a series of decree laws that closed avenues of legal immigration and punished illegal immigration in 1938 and 1939, reversing the nation's tradition of being a country of asylum. Daladier's decree of November 12, 1938 gave the state the power to intern foreigners in camps.

As the Spanish Civil War came to a close in the first months of 1939, the armies of soon to be dictator Francisco Franco drove nearly 500,000 refugees north across the border with France. The French Third Republic responded by creating a series of internment camps to house and confine the refugees, the first of which was Rieucros. Historians cite French fears of social revolution and civil war, xenophobia, and the notion that foreign antifascists fleeing Franco, Mussolini, and Hitler wanted to draw France into another European war "to satisfy their personal lust for revenge" as motivating factors for France's hostile reception of refugees during this time. As a result, the majority of the interned populations in France on the eve of World War II were the first victims and opponents of European fascism, allowing for a near seamless takeover by the collaborationist Vichy regime when the Third Republic fell to Nazi Germany in June 1940.

== Internees ==
The following people were interned in the camp of Rieucros:

- Italian antifascist Ernesto Bonomini was interned and escaped the camp in April 1939
- Russian anarchist writer Ida Mett and her son
- German Communist resister Dora Schaul
- Journalist Hanka Grothendieck and her son, mathematician Alexandre Grothendieck
- Spanish Republican Isabel del Castillo and her son, writer Michel del Castillo
- Writer and journalist Lenka Reinerová
- French Communist resister Angelita Bettini
- Teresa Noce, Italian labor leader, activist and journalist

== Memorial Association ==
L'Association pour le souvenir de Rieucros is a memorial association established on August 12, 1992, with the goal "to preserve the memory of the suffering of the camp's internees but also to study the causes leading to the creation of such a camp in the recent past." Members of the Association include former internees and their surviving family members, among others. The association engages in educational and commemorative activities, including preserving the site of the camp, creating informative historical plaques, and participating in an annual commemorative ceremony on July 16, the National Day of Remembrance for Victims of Racist and Antisemitic Persecution on the anniversary of the Vel' d'Hiv Roundup.

Few traces remain of the camp. The barracks and barbed wire have disappeared. The most significant vestige of the camp today is a carved rock that depicts a soldier with a gun and the dates 1789 and 1939, marking the 150th anniversary of the French Revolution. A nearby rock bears the inscription "Gierke, Walter," a former internee of the camp who may have sculpted the memorial.
