= Élisabeth de Fontenay =

French philosopher and essayist (born 1934)

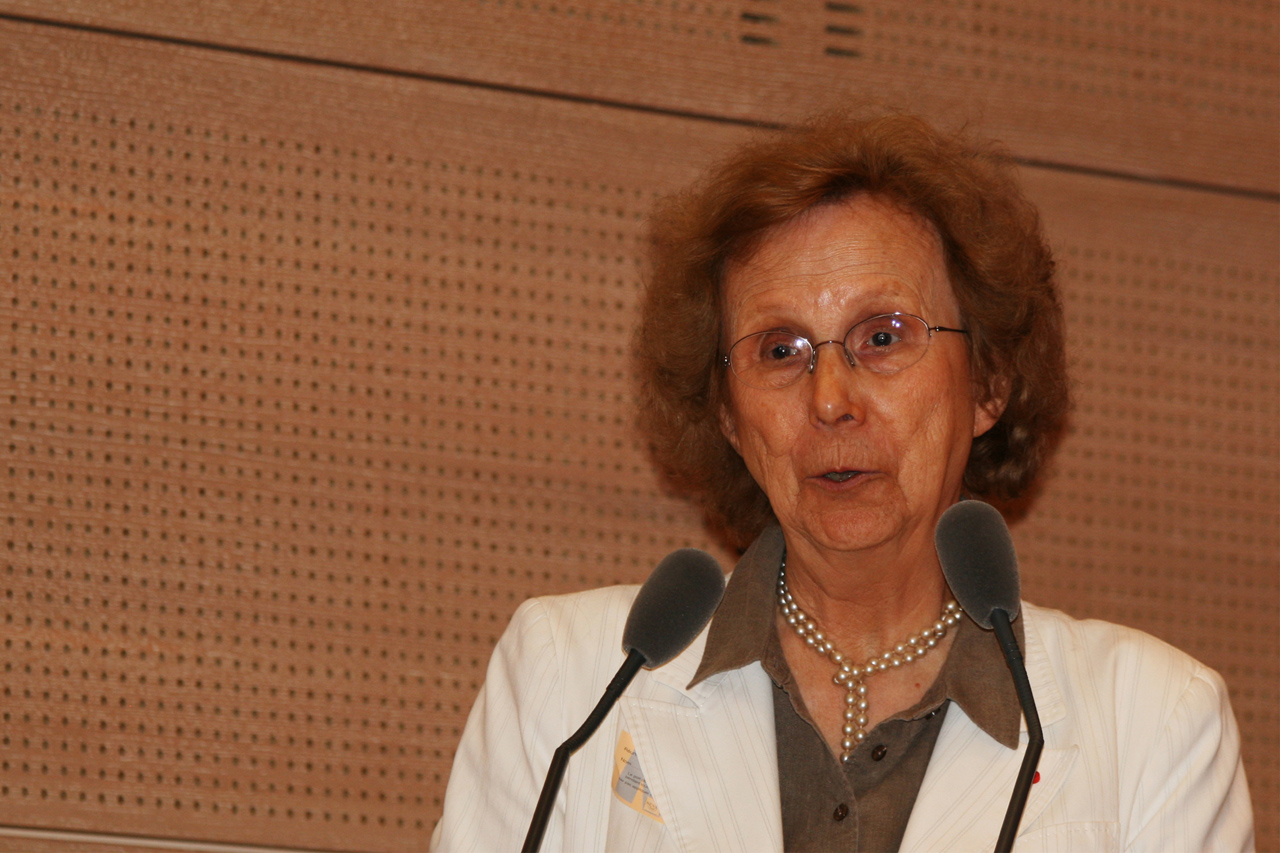
- Elisabeth de Fontenay in 2009
- Born: Élisabeth (nickname, "Isabelle") Bourdeau de Fontenay; 1934 (age 91–92)
- Occupations: Senior lecturer; philosopher; essayist
- Parents: Henri Bourdeau de Fontenay; Nessia Hornstein
- Awards: Prix Bordin (1982); Prix Anna-de-Noailles (2015); Prix Femina essai (2018)

Academic background
- Influences: Vladimir Jankélévitch; Michel Foucault; Jacques Derrida

Academic work
- Discipline: Jewish question; animal welfare
- Institutions: Paris 1 Panthéon-Sorbonne University
- Notable students: Catherine Chalier
- Notable works: Le silence des bêtes

Élisabeth de Fontenay (born in 1934), is a French philosopher and essayist, and a recognized philosopher of the Jewish question and animal welfare. She is a laureate of the Prix Bordin (1982), Prix Anna-de-Noailles (2015), and the Prix Femina essai (2018).

== Early life ==
Élisabeth (nickname, "Isabelle") Bourdeau de Fontenay is the daughter of Henri Bourdeau de Fontenay, from a right-wing Catholic family, a lawyer who supported the Front Populaire and an early Resistance fighter, and Nessia Hornstein, a dentist of Jewish origin but converted to Catholicism, whose family had fled Odessa during the Odessa pogroms of 1905. A large part of Nessia's family was exterminated at Auschwitz.

Élisabeth was raised Catholic, baptized as a child, then enrolled at the age of five at the Collège Sainte-Marie in Neuilly-sur-Seine. At the age of 22, she abandoned Catholicism and turned to Judaism; she details her conversion in the book Actes de naissance (Birth certificates), published in 2011.

== Career and research ==
Fontenay is an Emeritus Senior lecturer in philosophy at the Paris 1 Panthéon-Sorbonne University. She had an early interest in Karl Marx, to whom she dedicated a work entitled Les figures juives de Marx: Marx dans l'idéologie allemande (Jewish figures in Marx: Marx in German ideology) (1973). In 1981, she published a landmark book on the materialism of Denis Diderot, Diderot ou le Matérialisme enchanté (Diderot or Enchanted Materialism). She was a member of the board of directors of the journal Les Temps modernes (Modern times), a position she relinquished in January 1983.

Among the authors who have influenced Fontenay's work are Vladimir Jankélévitch, Michel Foucault, and Jacques Derrida. After Jankélévitch's death in 1985, Fontenay founded the Association Vladimir Jankélévitch with Pierre Michel Klein and Béatrice Berlowitz.

Like her later works, this contribution examines the relationship between humans and animals in history. This reflection culminated in her magnum opus Le silence des bêtes (The silence of the beasts), published by Fayard in 1998. This work once again raises the question of what is "proper to man", and challenges the idea of a fixed difference between man and animal. Focusing on the long term, Fontenay examines conceptions of the animal from the Pre-Socratic philosophy to the present day, via René Descartes and his animal machine hypothesis. Between 2007 and 2010, Fontenay chaired the "Commission Enseignement de la Shoah" (Shoah Education Commission) of the Fondation pour la Mémoire de la Shoah. Drawing on her position as President of the Commission, Fontenay, like Isaac Bashevis Singer, does not hesitate to draw a parallel between Nazi genocidal methods and the agri-food industry in the preface to Le silence des bêtes.

She was a signatory of La Paix maintenant (Peace Now). She is also a member of the Comité consultatif national d'éthique, alongside Henri Atlan. Concerned by the ethical issues surrounding the treatment of animals, she and Donald M. Broom published Le bien-être animal (Animal welfare) (Éditions du Conseil de l'Europe, "Regard éthique", 2006), which sets out the ethical issues raised by this subject, examining religious viewpoints and the positions of different countries.

From September 2010, Fontenay presented, with Fabienne Chauvière, a program dedicated to animals on France Inter: Vivre avec les bêtes (Living with the beasts). From the following season, she teamed up with Allain Bougrain-Dubourg to host the show, which ended in June 2014.

In 2018, she prefaced the book Le Nouvel Antisémitisme en France, a collective of texts by Luc Ferry, Pascal Bruckner, Philippe Val, Boualem Sansal, Éric Marty, Georges Bensoussan, Jean-Pierre Winter, Daniel Sibony, Barbara Lefebvre, Monette Vacquin, Michel Gad Wolkowicz, Noémie Halioua, Jacques Tarnero, Caroline Valentin, and Lina Murr Nehmé.

== Awards ==
- 1982, Prix Bordin, Académie française, for Diderot ou Le matérialisme enchanté
- 2015, Prix Anna-de-Noailles, Académie française, for La prière d'Esther
- 2018, Prix Femina essai, for Gaspard de la nuit. Autobiographie de mon frère

== Selected works ==
- Les Figures juives de Marx : Marx dans l'idéologie allemande (Marx's Jewish Figures: Marx in German Ideology), Paris, Éditions Galilée, 1973, coll. « La Philosophie en effet » ISBN 2-7186-0006-3
- Diderot ou Le matérialisme enchanté (Diderot or Enchanted Materialism), Paris, Éditions Grasset & Fasquelle|, 1981 ISBN 2-246-23051-9. Rééd. Paris, Librairie générale française, 1984, coll. « Le Livre de poche » ISBN 2-253-03406-1 ; Paris, Grasset, 2001 ISBN 2-246-23052-7
- With Jacques Proust (ed.), Interpréter Diderot aujourd'hui (Interpreting Diderot today), International Cultural Center of Cerisy-la-Salle, conference 11 (21 July 1983), Paris, Le Sycomore, 1984 ISBN 2-86262-231-1
- "La raison du plus fort" (The Reason of the Strongest), preface to Trois traités pour les animaux (Three Treatises for Animals) of Plutarque, translated by Jacques Amyot, Paris, POL, 1992 ISBN 2-86744-197-8
- Le Silence des bêtes : la philosophie à l'épreuve de l'animalité (The Silence of the Beasts: Philosophy Put to the Test of Animality), Paris, Fayard, 1998 ISBN 2-213-60045-7 online review
- With Alain Finkielkraut, Des hommes et des bêtes (Of Men and Beasts), Geneva, S. Kaplun, Éditions du Tricorne, 2000, coll. « Répliques » ISBN 2-8293-0219-2
- "Les bêtes dans la philosophie et la littérature" (Beasts in Philosophy and Literature), in Denis Müller & Hugues Poltier, La Dignité de l'animal : quel statut pour les animaux à l'heure des technosciences ? (The Dignity of the Animal: What Status for Animals in the Age of Technoscience?), Labor & Fides, Geneva, 2000, coll. "Le champ éthique", no. 36, pp. 37–68 ISBN 2-8309-0995-X
- Les Mille et une fêtes : pourquoi tant de religions ? Petite conférence sur les religions (The Thousand and One Feasts: Why So Many Religions? A Short Lecture on Religions), Paris, Bayard, coll. "Les petites conférences", 2005 ISBN 2-227-47527-7
- Quand un animal te regarde (When an animal looks at you), with illustrations by Aurore Callias, Paris, Giboulées-Gallimard jeunesse, 2006, coll. "Chouette ! penser" ISBN 2-07-057182-3
- Une tout autre histoire : questions à Jean-François Lyotard (A Whole Different Story: Questions to Jean-François Lyotard), Paris, Fayard, 2006, coll. "History of Thought" ISBN 2-213-60610-2. In the appendix "Europe, the Jews and the Book" by Jean-François Lyotard, article published in Libération, 15 May 1990
- Sans offenser le genre humain : réflexions sur la cause animale (Without Offending Humanity: Reflections on the Animal Cause), Paris, Éditions Albin Michel|Albin Michel, 2008, coll. « Bibliothèque des idées » ISBN 978-2-226-17912-8
- With Marie-Claire Pasquier, Traduire le parler des bêtes (Translating the Speech of Animals), Paris, L'Herne, 2008, coll. "Carnets de l'Herne". Text of two conferences given at the Literary Translation Conference in Arles, 2006 ISBN 978-2-85197-696-3
- "L'abstraction du monde" (The abstraction of the world) in Regards sur la crise : réflexions pour comprendre la crise… et en sortir (Views on the crisis: reflections to understand the crisis... and get out of it), collective work directed by Antoine Mercier with Alain Badiou, Miguel Benasayag, Rémi Brague, Dany-Robert Dufour, Alain Finkielkraut…, Paris, Hermann éditions, 2010
- Actes de naissance (Birth certificates), interviews with Stéphane Bou, Paris, Le Seuil, 2011
- La prière d'Esther (Esther's prayer), Éditions du Seuil, 2014
- En terrain miné (In a Mined Terrain), with Alain Finkielkraut, Stock, September 2017 ISBN 978-2234083424
- Gaspard de la nuit. Autobiographie de mon frère (Gaspard of the night. Autobiography of my brother), Stock, August 2018,
- La grâce et le progrès: Réflexions sur la Révolution française et la Vendée (Grace and Progress: Reflections on the French Revolution and the Vendée), 2020, ed. Stock, ISBN 2234089328
