= Primo Levi Center =

Care center for victims of torture and political violence

The Primo Levi Center (in French: Centre Primo Levi) is a care center in Paris for people who are victims of torture and political violence in their country of origin and today refugees in France. These people are seen by doctors, psychologists and a physiotherapist. They can also receive the help of a social worker and a lawyer.

The association also has a training center for the use of people who come into contact with these patients in the course of their work.

Finally, the association tries to testify on the reception conditions and the need for care, in France, for victims of torture and political violence.

The Primo Levi center received in 2004 the Human Rights Prize of the French Republic for its care center, in 2000 the Special Mention for its action with children and in 2013 the Women's Award of the Foundation RAJA for its action with women.

== Creation of the care center ==
The Primo Levi care center is an Association loi de 1901 created in May 1995 by five militant associations in the field of human rights, health and justice: Action des Christians pour l'Abolition de la Torture, Amnesty International of France, Juristes sans frontières, Médecins du Monde an Trèves.

These five associations are still present on the board of directors.

== Activities ==
=== Caring for people who are victims of torture ===
Torture has devastating and lasting effects, both physically and psychologically. Torture continues to torture long after it has been inflicted, and the trauma affects the whole family, including in the long term and for generations to come.

The Primo Levi care center receives patients for medical consultations, during which the doctors first focus on resolving the immediate health concerns of the patients (most of the time these are insomnia, nightmares, headaches but also various pains resulting from past abuse they may have suffered).

These people can also benefit from psychological counseling. Torture, far from "making people speak", silenced them, reached them in their privacy, in their capacity to think, to forge links with other human beings, to have a place in a group, in their couple, their family, their home community. A psychological follow-up can help them to try to come out of isolation, to reconnect.

The center takes care of 350 victims each year, a third of whom are new. One victim in three is a minor.

=== Train, share ===
The health center team shares its experience to train other professionals working with migrants who have allegedly suffered such abuse. During these trainings, they learn, for example, to approach a person who has experienced such episodes, to understand the trauma and its manifestations, or to specify the specificity of helping children.

=== Inform and testify ===
The Primo Levi center tries to engage the general public and the public authorities on the themes of the fight against torture, the reception policy for asylum seekers, the defense of the right to asylum and human rights violations (publication of a quarterly review, intervention at conferences, press releases, provision of an online documentation center, promotion of the United Nations International Day of Support for Victims torture...).

It is therefore a member of several groups intervening in the fields of asylum law and health: French coordination of asylum law (CFDA), Observatory of the right to health of foreigners (ODSE), European network of care centers for victims of torture, Collective for the defense of human rights in Turkey, French-speaking network for the care and support of exiled victims of torture and political violence (RESEDA).

The association also sits on the National Consultative Commission on Human Rights (CNCDH).

In the between-rounds of the 2017 presidential election between Marine Le Pen and Emmanuel Macron, the Primo Levi Center implicitly called in a forum with sixty other associations to block the FN candidate.

== Name ==
The name of the Italian chemist and writer Primo Levi has a symbolic value: it is synonymous with the rejection of inhuman, cruel and degrading treatment, the rejection of outrages upon human dignity and of discrimination.

In addition, his reflections on the question of memory, the "after-trauma, the shame, the guilt of the survivors" are elements on which the association works daily.

== Support committee ==
The support committee of the center is composed of: Patrick Aeberhard, Jacques Attali, Miguel Benasayag, Paul Bouchet, Laurent Gaudé, Constantin Costa-Gavras, Robert Guédiguian, Louis Joinet, François Julien-Laferrière, Jean Lacouture, Olivier Le Cour Grandmaison, Anicet Le Pors, Ariane Mnouchkine, Edgar Morin, Rithy Panh, Serge Portelli, Nicole Questiaux, Michel Rocard, Léonie Simaga, Catherine Teitgen-Colly, Tzvetan Todorov, Annette Wieviorka.
