= Dora Schaul =

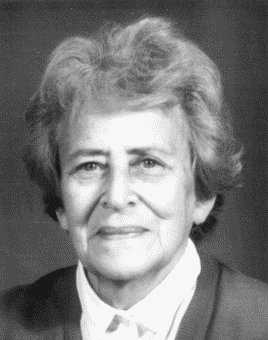
- Born: Dora Davidson; 21 September 1913; Berlin, German Empire
- Died: 8 August 1999 (aged 85); Berlin, Germany
- Occupation: Resistance activist
- Spouse(s): Alfred Benjamin (1911–1942); Hans Schaul (1905–1988)
- Children: Peter Schaul

Dora Schaul (born Dora Davidsohn, 21 September 1913 – 8 August 1999) was a German woman noted particularly for her undercover work at official offices in German-occupied France during World War II. She passed on significant information to the French Resistance. Her experiences and those of numerous other German opponents of the National Socialist (Nazi) regime in Germany were described in her 1973 book Résistance – Erinnerungen deutscher Antifaschisten (Résistance — Memories of German Antifascists). She has been honored in France by the naming of a street in Brens, Tarn, and in Germany by a plaque near her long-time residence in Berlin.

== Life ==
=== Early years ===
Dora Davidsohn was born in Berlin into a Jewish family. When she was aged 4 the family relocated to Essen where they set up a small shop, specialising in radios and phonographs. She attended a commercially oriented secondary school ("Handelsschule") and then took a job as a sales representative in Berlin.

=== Exile ===
In January 1933, a few months after her nineteenth birthday, national politics intervened in her life with the change of government. Antisemitism became mainstream, and in order to obtain work Dora Davidsohn emigrated to Amsterdam in the Netherlands. By the end of 1934 she had met Alfred Benjamin, another German Jewish exile and a man who, as a member of the German Communist Party since 1930, had additional reasons of his own to stay out of Germany where Communist party membership was by now illegal. Benjamin and Davidsohn would later marry.

Early in 1934 the party instructed Alfred Benjamin to relocate to Paris where the party leadership had established their headquarters in exile. Davidsohn accompanied him. They arrived in October 1934, setting up home in a small room, later described by Davidsohn as "très étroite et fort sale" ("filthy and very narrow") in the 5th arrondissement in the city's left bank district. The hostel they inhabited had a single tap and a single wc. The couple had no work permits, but were able to survive with intermittent casual work. They also obtained 5 francs per day in basic support from the Soviet sponsored International Red Aid organisation.

=== War and capture ===
Early in September 1939 France declared war on Germany, two days after the German army had launched an invasion of Poland. Dora Davidsohn (still living with Alfred Benjamin, but not yet married to him) still had no work permit, but she responded to the outbreak of war by reporting to the local prefecture in order to regularise her residency status. After some rapid bureaucratic dithering, the authorities responded by arresting her as an enemy alien, and she was imprisoned at La petite Roquette. On 18 October 1939, joining a large number of others identified as enemy aliens, she was moved to Rieucros Women's Internment Camp at Mende in central southern France. In February 1942 all the detainees who had been held at Riecros were transferred to a recently converted camp at Brens, near to Albi. During their internment, on 22 February 1941, Alfred Benjamin and Dora Davidsohn married.

=== Resistance ===
On 14 July 1942, while others celebrated Bastille Day, Dora Benjamin escaped from the internment camp at Brens. It was a narrow escape: barely a month later, all the German and Polish Jews still held at Brens were separated from the other detainees and deported to concentration camps outside France. Alfred Benjamin escaped in August 1942 from a labour camp at Chanac where he was being held, but in September was killed in an accident while attempting to flee from Vichy France to Switzerland.

Like her husband, Dora Benjamin headed east after escaping, ending up in Lyon, where she joined the Resistance. She was provided in July 1942 with a false identity card in the name "Renée Gilbert", a name which later became "unsafe" and was replaced with "Renée Fabre". At this time the southern part of France was still independent of German occupation, but in November 1942 the so-called Free zone was occupied by the German army and redesignated as the Southern zone. German supervision became much more intrusive and, especially for resistance activists, threatening. Despite having lived in France for nearly ten years, she still spoke with a German accent, and therefore passed herself off as originally from Alsace (which had been part of Germany till 1919, and in most of which the preferred language for daily conversation is a dialect of German).

Able to understand German without arousing suspicion, Dora Benjamin obtained work at a former medical school at 14 Avenue Berthelot, which had recently been requisitioned for use as a Sorting Office for the Military postal service. The postal service did not need the entire building, and a few weeks after Benjamin started work as a postal worker, the Gestapo took over the rest of the building for use as an administrative centre. The regional Gestapo leader, aged only 29 on his appointment in November 1942, was Klaus Barbie who, four decades later, found himself at the centre of a high-profile war-crimes trial in France. In the 1940s Barbie had his office in the same building as the military postal service. During this time, in July 1943, Dora Benjamin was able to get hold of a complete list of the Gestapo members in the Lyon district. She did not dare copy the names, because it might have been impossible to do so without her two French colleagues finding out which would have put them in danger, so she memorised the information before passing it on to a Resistance colleague. The list found its way, virtually complete, to London, and a few days later listeners to BBC Radio French language transmissions from London were treated to a listing of the names, addresses and ranks of the Gestapo members in Lyon including, of course, those of the local Gestapo chief, Klaus Barbie. The incident triggered great unrest among Gestapo members across France.

Her work also enabled her to obtain and pass on more routine information on matters such as troop movements which were fed, via the Resistance network, back to Germany's enemies, while sources also indicate that her contacts with German soldiers gave her opportunities to distribute anti-Nazi fly-sheets and leaflets.

=== The family she left behind ===
When Dora Davidsohn left Germany in 1933, her Jewish parents stayed behind, together with her sister Lotte, six years older than Dora. In 1942 they were arrested and deported to the Majdanek concentration camp in occupied Poland. Here they were murdered.

=== After the war ===
Dora Benjamin remained in France for the rest of the war. War ended in May 1945, leaving what remained of Germany divided into allied zones of occupation. Berlin was now surrounded by a large Soviet occupation zone, and it was to this area, under Soviet administration, that she returned in 1946. 1946 was the year in which she married Hans Schaul (1905-1988), a Communist lawyer-journalist who had spent most of the war years in a succession of internment camps under (collaborationist) French control; but after his French-Algerian captors handed him over to the British in 1943 he had been able to travel to Moscow in November 1944, working as an instructor of German prisoners of war in various anti-fascist schools. For the next few years Dora Schaul worked as a research assistant at the Marxist Leninist Institute which had been established by the recently formed ruling SED (party) of the German Democratic Republic, the Soviet sponsored stand-alone German state itself founded in October 1949 out of what had till then been the Soviet occupation zone. She was also able to re-establish contact with some of the fellow survivors from the internment camps at Rieucros and Brens.

In 1973 Dora Schaul published Résistance – Erinnerungen deutscher Antifaschisten (Memories of German Antifascists), which dealt with Germans who had fled to France in order to avoid Nazi persecution at home. She was at this stage still also working intensively on researching opposition to the Nazi regime, and on preserving contacts with schools in Treptow, the part of Berlin where she lived during the final part of her life, in order to ensure that the lessons from the Nazi years should never be forgotten.

== Honours ==
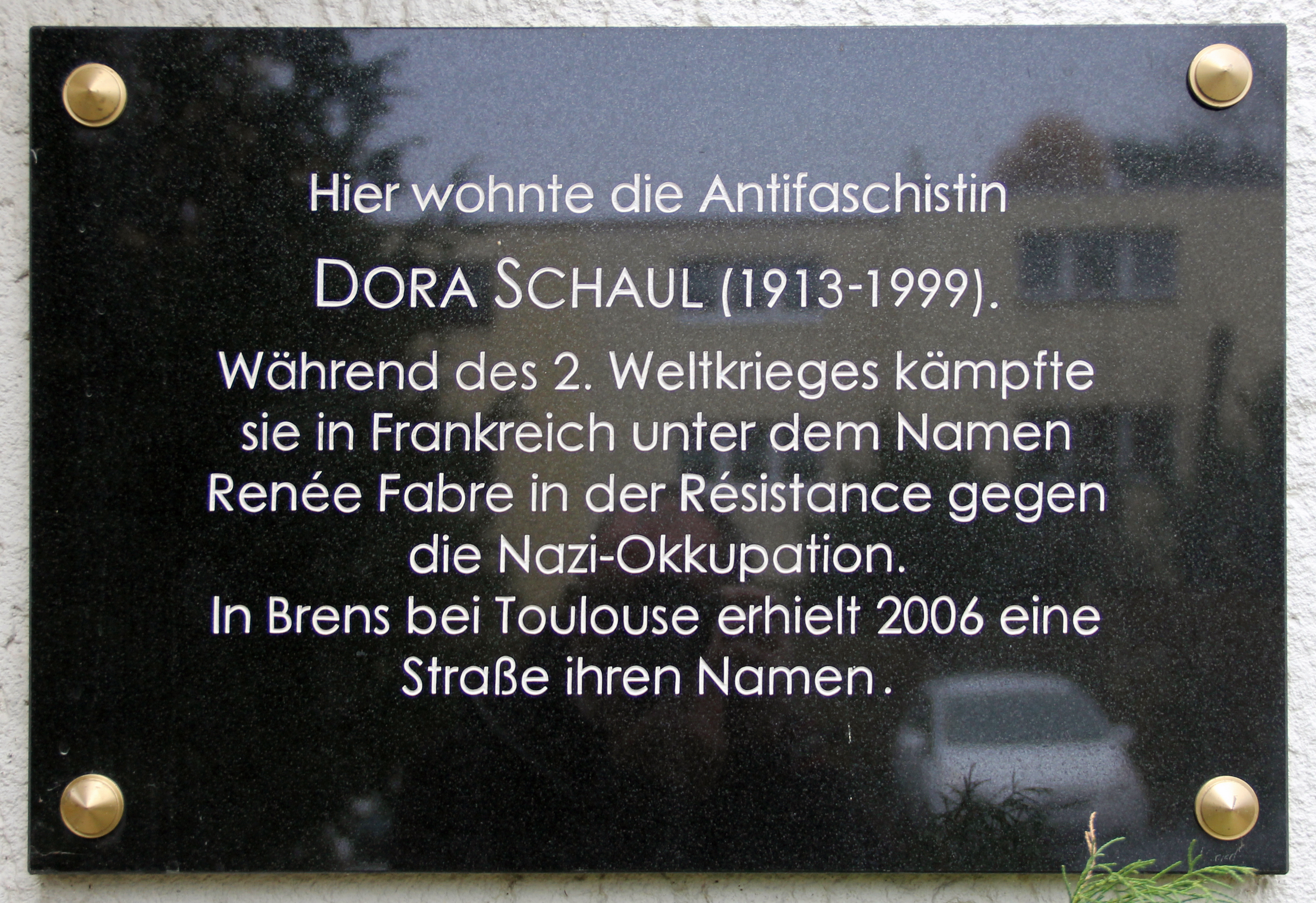
Memorial tablet at Dammweg 73, in Berlin-Plänterwald

On 12 March 2006, a street in Brens was renamed. The Route Dora Schaul ("Dora Schaul Road") leads past the site of the former women's internment camp in which Dora Schaul spent several months until her escape. Her son, Peter Schaul, was present at the renaming ceremony: he spoke of his pride and satisfaction that at a time when the past is in danger of disappearing into oblivion, there were still moves to turn back the wheel of history, "because there is a local community in France, a country that suffered under German occupation, naming a street after a German anti-Fascist. I find that remarkable, courageous and gratifying, and it makes me all the more determined to do what is in my power to see to it that the demon of Fascism is given no chance [to return]."

On 8 August 2009, which was the tenth anniversary of her death, a commemorative tablet was placed on the outside of the house at Dammweg 73 in Berlin-Treptow. The house was home to Dora Schaul during her final years. The inscription reads as follows:

- The Anti-Fascist DORA SCHAUL (1913-1999) lived here. During the Second World War, she fought in the French Resistance under the name "Renée Fabre" against Nazi occupation. In Brens, near Toulouse, a street was named after her in 2006.

The placing of the memorial tablet resulted from a local initiative by the BdA (Treptow anti-fascist league) and the local Civic Committee for Vision and Responsibility. Its unveiling was accompanied by speeches from the leader of the district council, Siegfried Stock and other local civic leaders.
