= Catherine Chalier =

French philosopher, Hebrew to French translator

- Born: October 2, 1947 (age 79); Paris
- Awards: 2017 French Voices Award

Education
- Education: University of Tours
- Thesis: Essai sur l'existence religieuse : Judaïsme et altérité (1981)
- Doctoral advisor: Francis Kaplan

Philosophical work
- Era: Contemporary philosophy
- Region: Western philosophy
- Institutions: Paris X (Institut de recherches philosophiques); PhiloMonaco
- Main interests: Jewish thought, Levinas, Spinoza
- Website: https://dep-philo.parisnanterre.fr/les-enseignants/chalier-catherine

Catherine Chalier (born in Paris, 2 October 1947) is a French philosopher, translator, and author of works on Jewish thought and philosophy. She specializes in the work of Emmanuel Levinas, as well as that of Franz Rosenzweig and Baruch Spinoza. A convert from Catholicism to Judaism, she is a professor emeritus at Paris Nanterre University, also known as Paris X.

== Background, education, and career ==
During la classe terminale, the final year of French secondary school, she was a student of Élisabeth de Fontenay. She defended her doctoral thesis [Essai sur l'existence religieuse : judaïsme et altérité (Essay on Religious Existence: Judaism and Alterity)] at the University of Tours in 1981 under the supervision of Francis Kaplan in the field of philosophy of religion.

At the age of 22, and following her first voyage to Israel, Chalier learned Hebrew and studied under Levinas himself at Paris X. It was the 1960s and, while his lectures emphasized the works of Hegel and Husserl above his own writings, she was deeply moved by the man himself, his story as a survivor of the Holocaust, and the optimism that she perceived in him. She has spoken about this in interviews. She associated this "light" with the commitment to "choose life" in the Jewish Scriptures and to the very Levinasian philosophy of responsibility to others, in particular those who suffer. She began to attend his Torah classes at the synagogue of the École normale israélite orientale (Paris), where he was passionate about teaching others the power of deriving "fresh insights" from the Torah rather than merely memorizing it.

Chalier has supervised many doctoral theses, including that of Christophe Schaeffer.

Chalier is a member of the jury for the awards at Les Rencontres Philosophiques de Monaco.

=== Reception ===
Matthew Ray of the University of Bristol reviewed What Ought I to Do?: Morality in Kant and Levinas for the Heythrop Journal in 2004. Ray calls it a "comparative study" of Kant and Levinas on the question of the source of ethics which acknowledges that neither philosopher really addressed the actual location of morality. In fact, as Ray writes, Chalier spends a good deal of the introduction establishing that philosophy more broadly has a blind spot in the "questionable status of the free subject." Chalier proceeds throughout the book to compare and oppose Kant and Levinas on such key points as the finitude or infinity of the subject; the meaning of goodwill, the Levinasian concept of 'the face'; and the "issue of the moral significance of autonomy." The fault Ray finds in Chalier's analysis is that she doesn't confront real opposition to the too-similar views of Kant and Levinas; he suggests that she might have found something in Kierkegaard's strong association of religion with ethics. He grants that her book is otherwise thoroughly researched. Yet, while he acknowledges that she does address religion in chapter eight, it is chiefly to question whether Levinas' Judaism and Kant's Christianity operate similarly. Furthermore, as Ray argues, Chalier is adequately skeptical of Kant's "moral proof of the being of God," albeit with spelling out her reasons. Ray considers Chalier an undisputed "authority on Levinas" The book "fruitfully, if a little uncritically at times" relates Levinas' work to mature Kant's ethical writings and opens up new perspectives on Levinas, but unfortunately, in Ray's view, fails to engage with the secondary literature on Kant or Levinas.

=== Awards and distinctions ===
- Prix de la Coopération Féminine, Fondation Julien et Stella Rozan, Paris, announced in December 1989, presented in 1990
- Prize from the Association Zadoc Kahn, Paris, May 1995
- Prix Colladon, Geneva, September 2003, with Marc Faessler, for L'écoute en partage; awarded for an outstanding work of theology
- Award from the Académie des sciences morales et politiques, 2006, for Spinoza lecteur de Maïmonide
- Prix Francine et Antoine Bernheim pour les Arts, les Lettres et les Sciences, Fondation du Judaïsme Français, 2010
- Prix des Écrivains Croyants, 2010, for La nuit, le jour : au diapason de la création
- 2017 French Voices Award for Reading the Torah: Beyond the Fundamentalist and Scientific Approaches (Duquesne University Press, 2017)

== Works in French ==
=== Books ===
- Judaïsme et altérité, Lagrasse: Éditions Verdier, "Les Dix paroles", 1982, 298 pp. ISBN 2-86432-018-5
- Figures du féminin : lecture d'Emmanuel Levinas, La Nuit surveillée, "Questions", 1982. OCLC 9969744; new expanded edition, including the previously unpublished essay L'Extase du temps, Éditions des Femmes, 2007, 171 pp. ISBN 978-2-7210-0544-1
- Les matriarches : Sarah, Rebecca, Rachel et Léa, Le Cerf, March 1985. ISBN 2-204-02344-2; 3rd revised and expanded edition, with a preface by Emmanuel Levinas, 1991, 224 pp. ISBN 2-204-02344-2
- La persévérance du mal, Le Cerf, "La Nuit surveillée", October 1987, 226 pp. ISBN 2-204-02748-0
- L'Alliance avec la nature, Le Cerf, "La Nuit surveillée", September 1989, 212 pp. ISBN 2-204-03173-9
- L'Histoire promise, Le Cerf, April 1992, 330 pp. ISBN 2-204-04418-0
- Lévinas : l'utopie de l'humain, Albin Michel, "Présences du judaïsme", 1993, 168 pp. ISBN 2-226-06351-X
- Pensées de l'éternité : Spinoza, Rosenzweig, Le Cerf, "La Nuit surveillée", March 1993. ISBN 2-204-04762-7
- Sagesse des sens : le regard et l'écoute dans la tradition hébraïque, Albin Michel, "L'Être et le corps", 1994. ISBN 2-226-07607-7
- L'Inspiration du philosophe : « L'amour de la sagesse » et sa source prophétique, Albin Michel, "La Pensée et le sacré", August 1996, 211 pp. ISBN 2-226-08732-X
- Pour une morale au-delà du savoir : Kant et Levinas, Albin Michel, "Bibliothèque Albin Michel des idées", February 1998, 225 pp. ISBN 2-226-09987-5
- With Marc Faessler, Judaïsme et christianisme : l'écoute en partage, Le Cerf, "Patrimoines. Judaïsme", September 2001, 504 pp. ISBN 2-204-06740-7
- La Trace de l'infini : Emmanuel Levinas et la source hébraïque, Le Cerf, "Philosophie et théologie", May 2002, 267 pp. ISBN 2-204-06922-1
- La Fraternité : un espoir en clair-obscur, Buchet-Chastel, "Au fait", 2003, 156 pp. ISBN 2-283-01960-5
- Traité des larmes : fragilité de Dieu, fragilité de l'âme, Albin Michel, 2003, 219 pp. ISBN 2-226-13683-5; paperback edition, "Spiritualité vivante", 2007, 219 pp. OCLC 470579848
- With photographs by Didier Ben Loulou, Sincérité du visage, Éditions Filigranes, June 2004, 86 pp. ISBN 978-2-226-17860-2
- La Patience : passion de la durée consentie, Autrement, "Morales", September 2004, 219 pp. ISBN 2-7467-0555-9
- De l'intranquillité de l'âme, Manuels Payot, 1998, 138 pp. ISBN 2-228-89200-9; paperback edition, "Petite bibliothèque", 2005, 134 pp. ISBN 2-7436-1390-4
- Les Lettres de la Création : l'alphabet hébraïque, Arfuyen, "Les carnets spirituels", September 2006, 155 pp. ISBN 978-2-84590-093-6
- Spinoza lecteur de Maïmonide : la question théologico-politique, Le Cerf, "Philosophie et théologie", March 2006, 326 pp. ISBN 978-2-204-08015-6
- Des Anges et des hommes, Albin Michel, January 2007, 279 pp. ISBN 978-2-226-17298-3
- Transmettre de génération en génération : essai, Buchet-Chastel, 7 May 2008, 272 pp. ISBN 978-2-283-02282-5
- La Nuit, le Jour : au diapason de la création, Le Seuil, 2009, 249 pp. ISBN 978-2-02-098447-8. Prix des écrivains croyants, 2010.
- Le Désir de conversion, Le Seuil, 2011, 283 pp. ISBN 978-2-02-095907-0
- Kalonymus Shapiro : rabbin au ghetto de Varsovie, 1889-1943, Éditions Arfuyen, "Les carnets spirituels", 6 October 2011. ISBN 978-2-84590-164-3
- Présence de l'espoir, Le Seuil, "Les dieux, les hommes", 2013, 195 pp. ISBN 978-2-02-104805-6
- Lire la Torah, Le Seuil, "Les dieux, les hommes", 2014, 190 pp. ISBN 978-2-02-109932-4
- La gravité de l'amour : Philosophie et spiritualité juives, PUF, "Chaire Étienne Gilson", 2016.
- L’Appel des images, Actes Sud, "Le Souffle de l’esprit", 2017, 112 pp. ISBN 978-2-330-08692-3
- Mémoire et pardon, François Bourin, January 2018, 250 pp. ISBN 979-10-252-0371-2
- Le Rabbi de Kotzk (1787-1859) : Un hassidisme tragique, Arfuyen, "Les Carnets spirituels", no. 99, 2018, 136 pp. ISBN 9782845902633
- Pureté, impureté. Une mise à l'épreuve, Bayard Culture, 16 January 2019, 320 pp. ISBN 978-2-227-49472-5
- Rabbi Chmuel Bornstein (1856-1926) L'espoir hassidique, Arfuyen, "Les carnets spirituels", no. 104, 7 February 2019, 120 pp. ISBN 978-2-845-90280-0
- Découvrir la gratitude au risque de l’asymétrie, Bayard, 2020. ISBN 978-2-2274-9793-1
- R. Mordechai Joseph Lerner (1801-1854), La liberté hassidique, Arfuyen, 2020. ISBN 978-2-845-90299-2
- Comme une clarté furtive. Naître, mourir, Bayard, 2021, 342 pp. ISBN 978-2-227-50020-4
- R. Tsaddoq haCohen de Lublin (1823-1900), La clarté hassidique, Arfuyen, 2022, 188 pp. ISBN 978-2-845-90329-6
- Il nous créa à son image. Un commentaire de la Genèse, Bayard, 2023, 524 pp. ISBN 978-2-227-50061-7
- La voix de Moïse, Éditions du Cerf, 25 September 2025, 280 pp. ISBN 978-2-204-15912-8
- L'exception du bien, Éditions Salvator, 9 April 2026, 190 pp. ISBN 978-2706730764

=== Translations from Hebrew ===
- Amos Funkenstein, Maimonides : nature, histoire et messianisme, Le Cerf, "La Nuit surveillée", February 1988, 124 pp. ISBN 2-204-02829-0
- Yoram Jacobson, La pensée hassidique, Le Cerf, "La Nuit surveillée", May 1989, 184 pp. ISBN 2-204-03062-7
- Josef Ben Chlomo, Introduction à la pensée du Rav Kook, Le Cerf, "Patrimoines. Judaïsme", 1992, 177 pp. ISBN 2-204-04564-0
- Moshe Idel, Messianisme et mystique, Le Cerf, "Patrimoines. Judaïsme", 1994, 118 pp. ISBN 2-204-04807-0
- Rabbi Yehudah Aryeh Leib Alter, the Rebbe of Gur, La langue de la vérité, followed by Penser avec les versets, Albin Michel, 2004, 202 pp. ISBN 2-226-15427-2
- Le Maggid de Mezeritch : aux sources du hassidisme, with an extended introduction, Arfuyen, "Les carnets spirituels", 2014, 176 pp. ISBN 978-2-845-90207-7
- Rabbi Nahman de Bratzlav (1772–1810), La nostalgie hassidique, with an extended introduction, Arfuyen, "Les carnets spirituels", 2024, 178 pp. ISBN 978-2-845-90378-4

=== Selected articles ===
- Chalier, Catherine. "Le désir de savoir a disparu pour lui, il est remplacé par des explications globales au service du pire." Madame Le Figaro, 27 June 2026.

== Works in English translation ==
- "Emmanuel Levinas: responsibility and election." Royal Institute of Philosophy Supplements 35 (1993): 63-76.
- With Tina Chanter. "The exteriority of the feminine," translated by Bettina Bergo, Feminist interpretations of Emmanuel Levinas, University Park, Pennsylvania (2001): 171-179.
- What Ought I to Do? Morality in Kant and Levinas, translated by Jane Marie Todd, Ithaca: Cornell University Press, 2002. ISBN 9780801487941.
- "Levinas and the Talmud." In The Cambridge Companion to Levinas (2002): 100-18. ISBN 9780521665650.
- Levinas and Education: At the Intersection of Faith and Reason. United Kingdom: Taylor & Francis, 2008. ISBN 9781135989408.
- With Ami Bouganim. "Emmanuel Levinas: School master and pedagogue." In Levinas and Education, pp. 25-37. Routledge, 2008.
- "The philosophy of Emmanuel Levinas and the Hebraic tradition." In Ethics as first philosophy, pp. 3-12. Routledge, 2013.
- "Blessing Precedes Cursing: Philosophical Reading of Genesis 3:16" Religions 15, no. 9: 1028, 2024.
