= Mauzi =

Mauzi may refer to

- Naseeruddin Mauzi (d. 1920), Indian Khilafat Movement activist
- Robert Mauzi (1927–2006), French professor of literary history
- Mauzi is the German name for the fictional Pokémon character, Meowth.
