= Canton of Gaillac =

Coordinates: 43.90°N 1.90°E

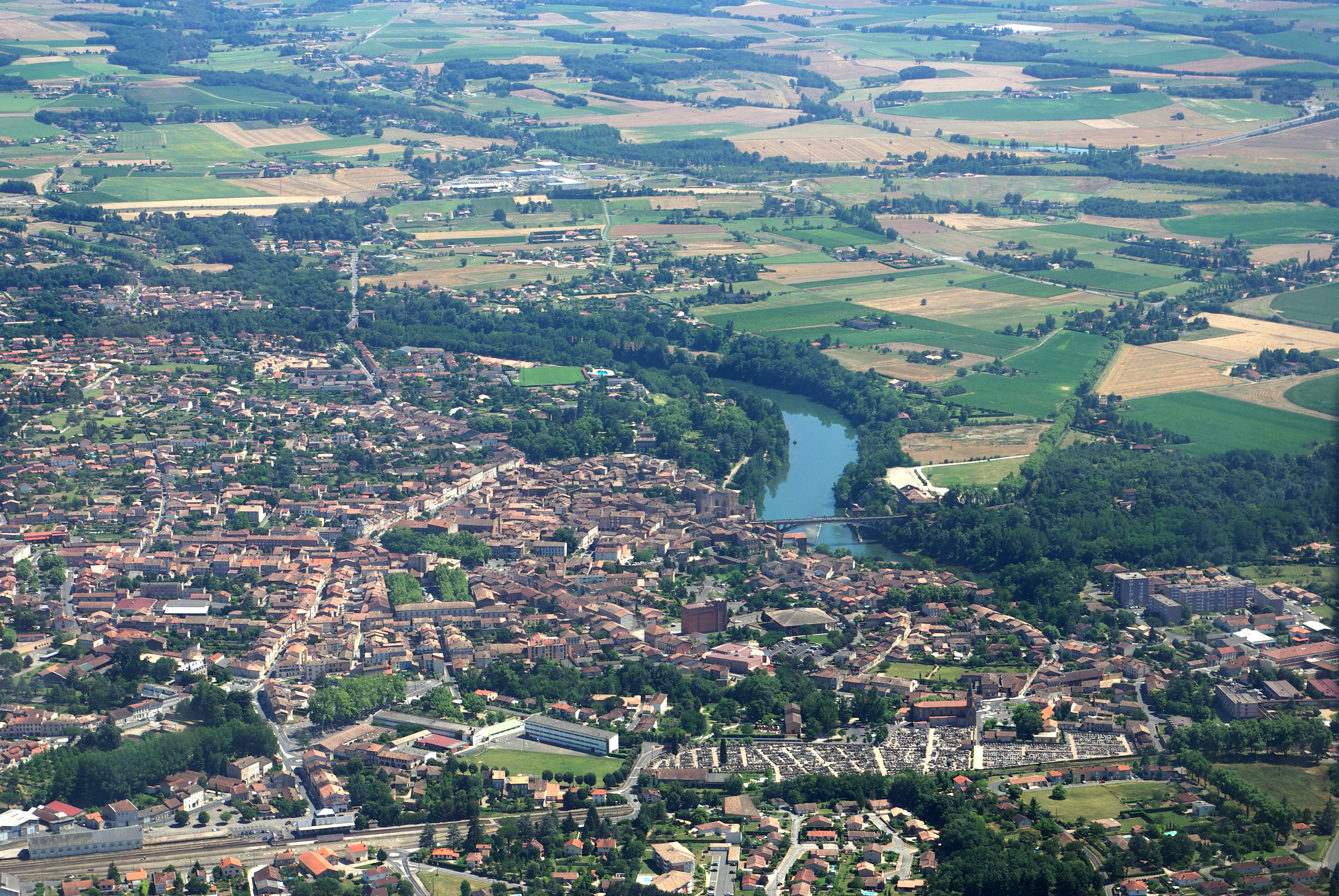

The canton of Gaillac is an administrative division of the Tarn department, southern France. Its borders were modified at the French canton reorganisation which came into effect in March 2015. Its seat is in Gaillac.

It consists of the following communes:

1. Brens
2. Broze
3. Gaillac
