= Michel del Castillo =

French writer (1933–2024)

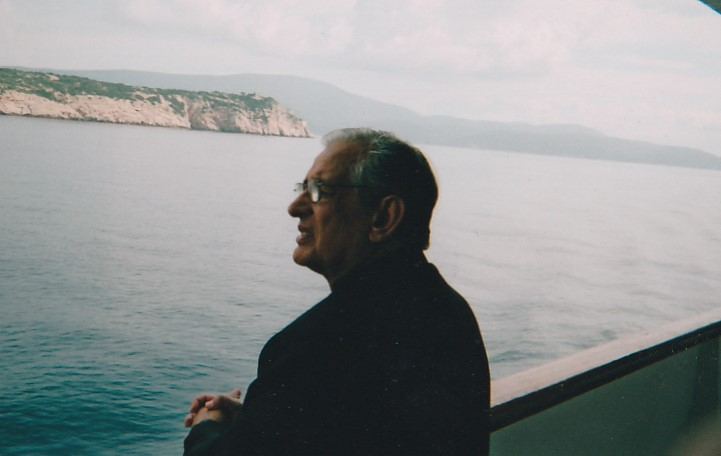
- Castillo in 2005
- Born: Michel Janicot del Castillo; 2 August 1933; Madrid, Spain
- Died: 17 December 2024 (aged 91)
- Occupation: Writer
- Writing career
- Notable awards: Prix Renaudot (1981); Prix Femina essai (1999)

Michel Janicot del Castillo (2 August 1933 – 17 December 2024) was a French writer.

== Life and career ==
Michel del Castillo was born in Madrid on 2 August 1933. His father, Michel Janicot, was French and his mother, Cándida Isabel del Castillo, was Spanish.

Interned in the concentration camp Rieucros in Mende with his mother during the Second World War, he developed a sense of belonging to this town, which has honoured him by naming a school after him.

He first studied politics and psychology, then turned to literature. Influenced by Miguel de Unamuno and Fyodor Dostoevsky, his books received many literary prizes, namely Prix Chateaubriand for Le Silence des Pierres (1975); Renaudot for La nuit du Décret (1981); Prix Maurice Genevoix for Rue des Archives (1994); Prix de l’Écrit Intime for Mon frère l’Idiot (1995); and Prix Femina essai for Colette, une Certaine France (1999).

In 1997 he became a member of the Académie royale de langue et de littérature françaises de Belgique, succeeding Georges Duby.

Aside from travelling, he was very keen on classical music, and considered at some point making a career as a pianist. Castillo died on 17 December 2024, at the age of 91.

== Bibliography ==
- Tanguy (A Child of Our Time) (1957)
- La Guitare (1958)
- Le Colleur d’affiches (The Disinherited) (1959)
- Le manège espagnol (1960)
- Tara (1962)
- Gérardo Laïn (1967) English translation, "The Seminarian" (1969)
- Les écrous de la haine (1968), essay
- Le Vent de la Nuit (1973), Prix des Libraires and Prix des Deux Magots
- Le silence des pierres (1975), Prix Chateaubriand
- Le sortilège espagnol (1977)
- Les cyprès meurent en Italie (1979)
- La Nuit du décret (1981), Prix Renaudot
- La gloire de Dina (1984)
- La halte et le chemin (1985)
- Seville (1986)
- Le démon de l'oubli (1987)
- Mort d'un poète (1989)
- Une femme en soi (1991), Prix du Levant
- Andalousie (1991)
- Le crime des pères (1993), Grand prix RTL-Lire
- Carlos Pradal (1993), co-written with Yves Belaubre
- Rue des Archives (1994), Prix Maurice Genevoix
- Mon frère l’Idiot (1995), Prix de l’écrit intime
- Le sortilège espagnol : les officiants de la mort (1996)
- La tunique d'infamie (1997)
- De père français (1998)
- Colette, une certaine France (1999), Prix Femina
- L’Adieu au siècle, journal de l'année 1999 (2000)
- Droit d’auteur (2000), pamphlet
- Les étoiles froides (2001)
- Colette en voyage (2002)
- Une répétition (2002), a play on Jean Sénac
- Algérie, l’extase et le sang (2002), essay
- Les portes du sang (2003)
- Le Jour du destin (2003), play
- Sortie des artistes (2004)
- Dictionnaire amoureux de L’Espagne (2005), Prix Méditerranée
- La mémoire de Grenade (2005), play
- La Religieuse de Madrigal (2006), novel
- La Vie mentie (2007), novel
- Le Temps de Franco (2008), narration.

== Sources ==
- Interview by Emmanuel Davidenkoff ("Les Enfants de la Musique") on France Musique, Saturday 18 December 2010.
