= Hans Schaul =

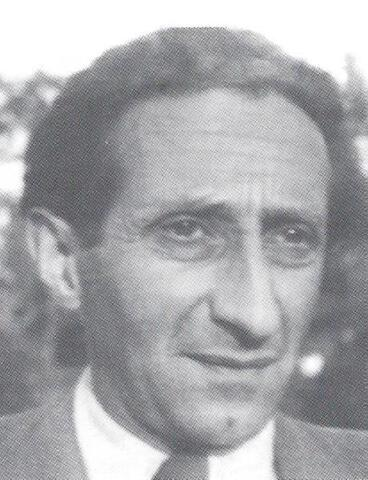
- Born: 13 December 1905; Hohensalza, Posen, Germany
- Died: 19 May 1988; Berlin, East Germany
- Occupations: Political activist Politician; Newspaper editor
- Political party: PCE; SED

Hans Schaul (13 December 1905 – 19 May 1988) was a German politician and a long-standing legally trained editor of the theoretical magazine of the Socialist Unity Party, Einheit.

As a younger man he volunteered and participated on the Republican (anti-Fascist) side in the Spanish Civil War.

== Early life and education ==
Schaul was born a few years after the opening of the twentieth century, at Hohensalza (as it was then known), a mid-sized newly industrialised town in the Prussian province of Posen. His father was employed in clerical work. From 1915 he attended a Secondary School in Frankfurt (Oder) that concentrated on Classics and Humanities. He then, between 1925 and 1928 undertook university level study in Economics and Law at Berlin, Freiburg and Heidelberg. The next three years he spent working as a trainee referendary in the Berlin law courts.

== Marriage and career ==
It was during this period that in 1929 Hans Schaul married the children's author, Ruth Rewald. Their daughter, Anja, would be born in 1937 and then killed in the Auschwitz concentration camp in 1944.

== Law practice ==
Schaul received his practice certificate in 1932, and thereafter worked as a lawyer in Berlin. However, January 1933 saw régime change and government policies in Germany became viciously anti-semitic. Schaul and his wife were Jewish. From 1933 he was barred from working as a lawyer in Germany and fled to France, at one stage working in Paris as a photographer. It was from France that in 1936 he joined the International Brigades, following which he took part in the Spanish Civil War on the anti-Francoist side. At times he was working in the International Brigade's General Inspectorate with the high-profile Italian Communist Luigi Longo (also known as "Gallo"). In 1937 Schaul became a member of the Spanish Communist Party, also working as an editor on several political newspapers.

== Spanish civil war ==
He returned to France in 1938 and worked for the "Support Committee" for German fighters in the Spanish Civil War. In or before 1939 he joined the Communist Party of Germany, the surviving leadership of which had escaped to Paris after Germany became a one-party dictatorship back in 1933.

== Second world war ==
War resumed, involving France and Germany, in September 1939: Schaul was interned at Saint-Jean-de-la-Ruelle near Orléans. He spent the next few years in a succession of internment camps, ending up by 1943 in the camp at Djelfa, a few hundred kilometers to the south of Algiers. The internment camp at Djelfa contained enemies identified by the collaborationist French government, who were mainly Communists, Jews, and former Spanish Civil War International Brigade members. In 1943 Schaul then became a member of a British Labour Corps in Algeria, following the Anglo-American military invasion of the entire region. In 1944 he was able to travel to the Soviet Union, arriving in November of that year. Here he was employed as an instructor for French and Japanese prisoners of war. He was then employed by Moscow's Administrative Head Office for Prisoners of War, working as an instructor at various "Antifascist Schools", notably "Anti-Fascist School 2041" at Talitsa.

War ended in May 1945 and in 1948 the Party Central Committee ordered him back to Germany, where he married Dora Davidsohn. Even before this marriage, however, he had obtained a post as the personal assistant to Heinrich Rau, chairman of the influential German Economic Commission in the part of what had been Germany that became, between 1945 and 1949, administered and designated as the Soviet occupation zone. In October 1949 the Soviet Occupation zone was reinvented as the German Democratic Republic, a Soviet sponsored separate German state with its constitutional arrangements and political power structure closely modeled on those in the Soviet Union itself. From 1949 he was working for the new country's Ministry for Planning, and in 1950 Schaul switched to the National Planning Commission itself.

== Later life ==
From 1951 till 1956 Hans Schaul worked as a professor at Berlin's Academy for Economics. After that he became chief editor with Einheit, which was a newspaper of the country's ruling SED (party), targeted at a readership able and willing to take an interest in "the theory and practice of Scientific Socialism". He kept the editorship till 1972.

== Awards and honours ==
- 1955 Patriotic Order of Merit
- 1965 Order of Karl Marx
- 1971 Patriotic Order of Merit
- 1975 Patriotic Order of Merit Gold clasp
