= Éric Marty =

French critic (born 1955)

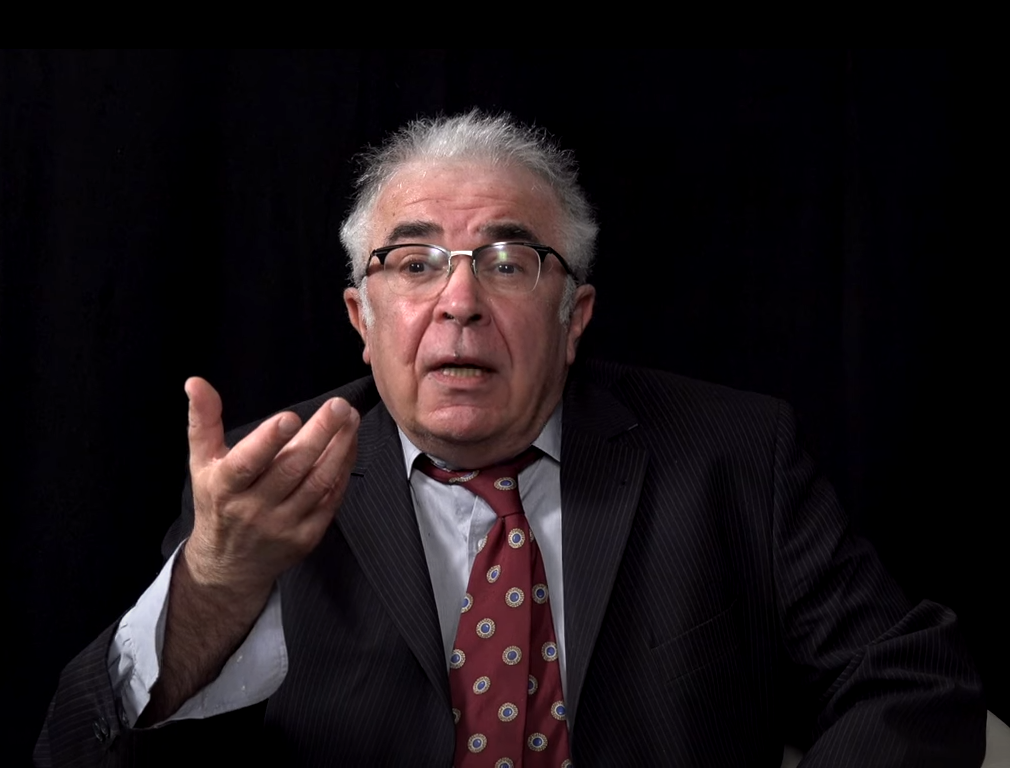
- Éric Marty in 2021
- Born: 3 January 1955 (age 71); Paris, France
- Citizenship: French
- Occupations: Writer, essayist and Professor of French Literature

Academic background
- Education: Lycée Condorcet
- Alma mater: Paris Diderot University

Éric Marty (born 3 January 1955) is a French intellectual, essayist, and emeritus professor at Paris Cité University. He was a professor of Contemporary French Literature at Paris Diderot University. He is the editor of the complete work of Roland Barthes.

== Biography ==
Between 1970 and 1973, Marty was active in the Trotskyist organisation Lutte Ouvrière. He passed the Agrégation in 1979 in modern literature, having studied at Lycée Condorcet and Paris Diderot University.

From 1980, he taught French literature, linguistics and philosophy at the Institut français du Royaume-Uni. In 1985, he returned to France and defended his third cycle thesis at the Sorbonne, under the supervision of Robert Mauzi.

In 1988, he joined the French National Centre for Scientific Research as a research fellow in the Institute of Modern Texts and Manuscripts, where he worked on the edition of André Gide's Journal for the Bibliothèque de la Pléiade as well as on the works of René Char and the theoretical texts of Roland Barthes.

== Works ==
=== Books ===
- L'Écriture du jour : le "Journal" d'André Gide. Paris: Seuil. 1985.
- René Char. Paris: Seuil. 1990.
- Sacrifice. Paris: Seuil. 1992.
- André Gide, Qui êtes-vous ?. Paris: La Manufacture. 1987.
- Louis Althusser : un sujet sans procès. Paris: Gallimard. 1999.
- Bref séjour à Jérusalem. Paris: Gallimard.
- Lacan et la littérature. Paris: Manucius. 2005.
- Jean Genet : Post-scriptum. Paris: Verdier. 2006.
- Roland Barthes : le métier d'écrire. Paris: Seuil. 2006.
- Une querelle avec Alain Badiou, philosophe. Paris: Gallimard. 2007.
- L'Engagement extatique : sur René Char suivi de Commentaire du fragment 178 des 'Feuillets d'Hypnos'. Manucius. 2008.
- Roland Barthes : la littérature et le droit à la mort. Paris: Seuil. 2010.
- Pourquoi le 20th century a-t-il pris Sade au sérieux ?. Paris: Seuil. 2011.
- Le Cœur de la jeune Chinoise. Paris: Seuil. 2013.
- Les Palmiers sauvages. Bordeaux: Confluences. 2015.
- La Fille. Paris: Seuil. 2015.
- Sur Shoah de Claude Lanzmann. Paris: Manucius. 2016.
- L'Invasion du dėsert, à partir de photographies de Jean-Jacques Gonzales. Manucius. 2017.
- Oui/Dizer Entendu/Dire. Brazil. 2021.
- Le Sexe des Modernes. Pensée du neutre et théorie du genre. Seuil. 2021.
- Entendu/dire. Geneva: Furor. 2023.

=== Articles ===
- Marty, Éric (1 March 2023). "L'État, notre Léviathan". Commune. Culture et émancipation depuis 1933.
