= Broze =

- Commune
- Location of Broze
- Location within France Location within Occitanie
- Coordinates: 43°57′10″N 1°53′31″E
- Country: France
- Region: Occitania
- Department: Tarn
- Arrondissement: Albi
- Canton: Gaillac
- Intercommunality: CA Gaillac-Graulhet

Government
  - Mayor (2020–2026): Patrick Lagasse
- Area^{1}: 4.02 km^{2} (1.55 sq mi)
- Elevation: 275 m (902 ft)
- Highest elevation: 285 m (935 ft)
- Lowest elevation: 178 m (584 ft)
- Population (2023): 107
  - Density: 26.6/km^{2} (68.9/sq mi)
- Time zone: UTC+01:00 (CET)
  - Summer (DST): UTC+02:00 (CEST)
- INSEE/Postal code: 81041 /81600
- ^{1} French Land Register data, which excludes lakes, ponds, glaciers > 1 km^{2} (0.386 sq mi or 247 acres) and river estuaries.

Broze (French pronunciation: [bʁoz]; Occitan: Bròsa) is a commune in the Tarn department in southern France.

== See also ==
- Communes of the Tarn department
