= Emmanuelle Lambert =

French writer (born 1975)

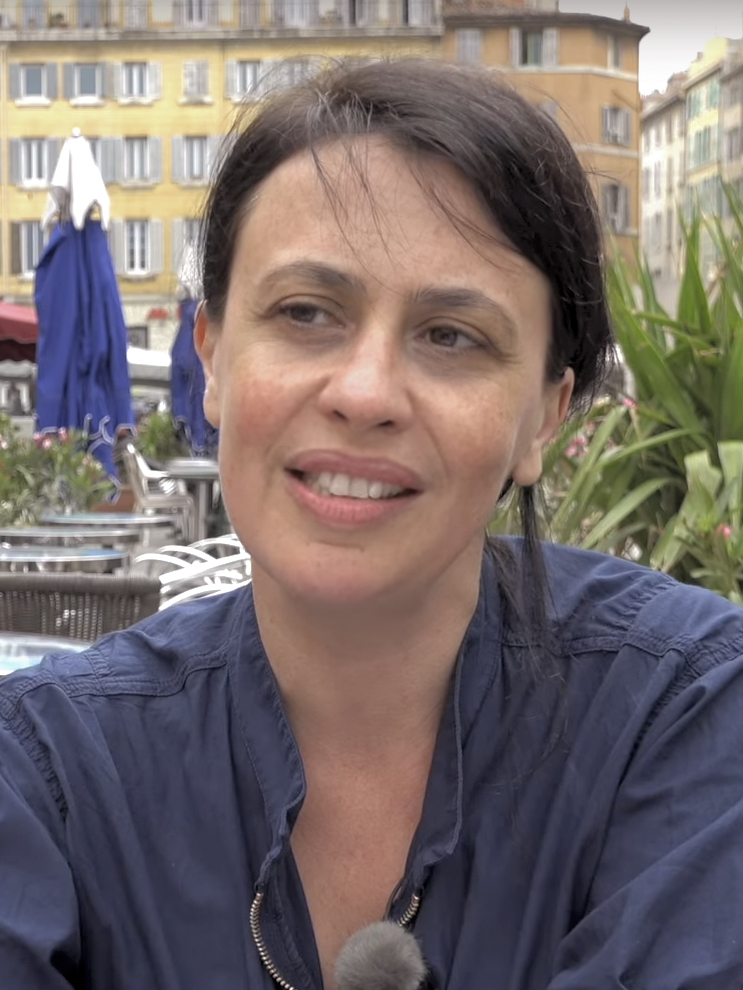
- Emmanuelle Lambert in 2018.
- Born: 7 June 1975 (age 50)

Emmanuelle Lambert (born 7 June 1975) is a French writer.

== Biography ==
Emmanuelle Lambert is an associate of modern letters and a doctor of letters, beginning in 2003, with a thesis on the theatre of Jean Genet.

After having worked with Alain Robbe-Grillet on the publication of some of his texts (Le Voyageur, 2001, Christian Bourgois; Scenarios en rose et noir, 2005, Fayard), in 2009 she devoted her first book to him, My great writer, and signed in 2012 the afterword to Catherine Robbe-Grillet's book of memories entitled Alain (Fayard).

In 2011, she became the author of a novel entitled Un peu de vie dans la mienne, and in 2013 she wrote La Tête haute.

She is curator of the exhibition held on Jean Genet at the Museum of European and Mediterranean Civilisations in 2016.

In January 2018, she published a novel entitled La Désertion with Stock Editions and in May 2018, a story, Apparitions de Jean Genet (Les Impressions Nouvelles).

In November 2019, she won the Femina essay prize for her book Giono, furioso.

She was curator of the Giono exhibition held at the Museum of European and Mediterranean Civilisations in 2019-2020.

In 2021, she published the Romans and poems of Jean Genet in the Bibliothèque de la Pléiade, with Gilles Philippe.

Her book Le Garçon de mon père was published in August 2021.

In November 2022, she published, with Éditions Gallimard, Sidonie Gabrielle Colette, a literary portrait of Colette, accompanied by photographs by Gisèle Freund, Robert Doisneau, Henri Cartier-Bresson, Irving Penn, Cecil Beaton and Lee Miller.

== Works ==
- Mon grand écrivain, récit, Les Impressions nouvelles, 2009
- Un peu de vie dans la mienne, roman, Les Impressions nouvelles, 2011
- La Tête haute, roman, Les Impressions nouvelles, 2013
- La Désertion, roman, Éditions Stock, 2018
- Apparitions de Jean Genet, récit, Les Impressions nouvelles, 2018
- Giono, furioso, roman, Éditions Stock, 2019
- Le Garçon de mon père, Éditions Stock, 2021
- Sidonie Gabrielle Colette, Éditions Gallimard, 2022
