= Ruth Rewald =

German writer of children's books

- Born: Ruth Gustave Rewald; 5 June 1906; Deutsch-Wilmersdorf (Berlin), Germany
- Died: after 18 July 1942; Auschwitz/Oświęcim death camp Oberschlesien (Upper Silesia), Germany
- Education: Berlin; Heidelberg
- Occupations: Writer of stories and novels for children and young people
- Spouse(s): Hans Schaul (1905–1988), as his first wife
- Children: Anja Schaul (1937–1944)
- Father: Artur Markus Rewald (1880–1957)

Ruth Rewald (1906–1942) was a German writer of children's books. In 1938, after five months in Spain, with the publication of "Vier spanische Jungen" she became the first mainstream author to produce a German language book about the Spanish Civil War written expressly for children and young people. By that time, however, her family home was a 50 m^{2} apartment in Paris to where, for reasons both of race and of politics, she had relocated following régime change at the start of 1933 in Germany. She was deported to Auschwitz in July 1942 and is believed to have been murdered shortly afterwards. Her daughter, born in 1937, suffered a similar death slightly under two years later.

Ruth Rewald married a young lawyer in 1929, after which for many purposes she used her married name. She continued to write under her former name, however, and it was during the early 1930s that some of her most commercially successful books were published. Sources may identify her either as "Ruth Rewald" or as "Ruth Schaul".

== Life ==
=== Provenance and early years ===
Ruth Gustave Rewald was born at Nachodstraße 4 in her parents’ apartment in Deutsch-Wilmersdorf, a densely populated former village to the southwest of Berlin into which it had been subsumed during the final years of the nineteenth century. For Berlin the period was one of rapid expansion and social change as farm workers were drawn to the city, attracted by the growing differential between farm wages and factory wages. The economic success of the city also attracted immigrants from further east, many of them escaping the acute austerity and politically driven repression that had become defining features of the Russian Empire. Ruth was her parents’ only recorded child. Ruth's father, Artur Markus Rewald (1880–1957), was a businessman whose own father had come from Pomerania and who would end his days, following a further move west of his own in 1938, living in Willesden (London, England). Sources differ as to the name of her mother, who is identified in birth records as Rose Wilhelmine Hirschfeld. The family was of German-Jewish provenance, classified in the terminology of those times as “assimilated German Jewish”. 1925 was the year in which her mother died, following which, in 1933, her father married Lotte Erol, a stage-performer from Vienna.

=== University student ===
It was also in 1925 that, despite her gender, she embarked on university-level studies in Jurisprudence, initially in Berlin and later at Heidelberg. In 1929, finding her university studies unfulfilling, she dropped out of university and for several months worked in a children's day-care centre.

=== Hans Schaul ===
The abandonment of her university degree course came directly before Rewald's marriage, which took place in Berlin on 6 November 1929. Her husband, Hans Schaul was a trainee court official whom she had met at university. He would later emerge as a left-wing political activist and fighter in the Spanish Civil War. At some point between 1933 and 1939 Schaul joined the (outlawed in Germany) Communist Party). Although there is no indication that Ruth Rewald ever joined any political party, her general political beliefs aligned with those of her husband.

=== Authorship ===
Ruth Rewald's first published children's stories, which may have been triggered by her experiences as an assistant in the children's day-care centre, included "Rudi und sein radio" (‘’"Eudi and his radio"’’), "Peter Meyer liest seine Geschichten vor" (‘’"Peter Meyer reads out his stories"’’), and, for a series of children's books, "Sonne und Regen im Kinderland" (‘’"Sun and Rain in the Land of Childhood"’’). Over the next couple of years there followed more children's stories, published in a few of the many regional daily newspapers produced during this period by the Social Democrats. More overtly political was her book "Müllerstrasse, Jungens von heute " (‘’loosely, " Müllerstrasse: Boys today”’’) published in 1932. In it the author described the oppressive conditions for working class children in Berlin who manage to overcome their aggressive urges thanks into creative group activities and finding “something meaningful to create”. This first full-length book, with its unmistakable echoes of the already much revered Erich Kästner, was well received by critics and, indeed, by book buyers.

=== Regime change in Germany: exile in Paris ===
In January 1933 the National Socialists were able to exploit the parliamentary deadlock created by the polarisation of German politics to take power, a development that was rapidly followed by a switch to one- party dictatorship. One of the first pieces of legislation passed following the abolition of democracy was the so-called Law for the Restoration of the Professional Civil Service passed in 1933. This was designed to remove Jews and political activists opposed to the Hitler government from public sector employment. Hans Schaul was effectively excluded from his chosen career as a lawyer in the German justice system. In May the couple relocated to Paris, which during 1933 became home to large numbers of political and race-driven exiles from Germany and indeed quickly emerged as one of three unofficial locations for the party leadership of the exiled Communist Party of Germany. (The others were Prague and Moscow.) In July 1933 their book collection and other possessions caught up with them, or more precisely were delivered to "Maison Biblion", a bookshop where later, for a several months starting in July 1934, Rewald was employed. Meanwhile, she continued to progress with her authorship work. Schaul's first employment following their arrival in Paris was as a photographer. Money was short and they were both obliged to take work where they could find it. During 1933/34, their first year in Paris, they lived at four (or more) different addresses in succession, from which some commentators infer that perhaps they did not intend to remain in the French capital for very long. They nevertheless quickly became well networked and closely integrated into the community of political refugees of which they were a part. Their circle included other exiled German authors, including Käthe Hirsch.

In the spring of 1934, the couple made a plan to move on from France, contacting an uncle in the United States who was using the name Marcus Saul for help. The plan developed so that Hans decided he would travel first to Palestine and meet up with another uncle, "Uncle Jean" who was already there, and move on from there to America, while Ruth would relocate directly from France and re-join her husband. The application papers were submitted to the U.S. consulate in Paris via the "Hebrew Immigrant Aid Society" (HIAS). In the event, for reasons that remain unclear, the emigration scheme failed: neither of them moved either to Palestine or to the U.S. When the Spanish Civil War erupted, closer to home, in the summer of 1936 they were still both leading a somewhat precarious life together in Paris. Rewald continued to produce books.

=== Spanish Civil War and motherhood ===
Despite his wife's pregnancy Hans Schaul went to Spain and joined the Chapayev Battalion of the XIII International Brigade during or shortly before November 1936. (Note: Sources are not consistent over whether Ruth Rewald accompanied her husband to Spain in November 1936, or whether he left her behind: plausible sourcing exists for both possibilities. But there is a preponderance of sources indicate that in 1936 she remained in Paris, while corresponding frequently with her husband as a result of which she quickly became well informed about the twists and turns of the Spanish Civil War undertaking her first visit to Spain only during the final quarter of 1937. Notwithstanding the shifting exigencies of pregnancy and motherhood, she nevertheless appears to have moved around a good deal through 1937.) She was keen to do what she could to support her husband and the anti-fascist fighters of the International Brigades in Spain more generally. She also had another book to research, this time with a focus on a book for children of Spain and the civil war. Shortly before the birth of her daughter, however she returned to Paris. Anje Schaul was born in the "Left Bank" in the 14th arrondissement of Paris on 16 May 1937.

=== Madrid and "Four Spanish Boys" ===
Slightly more than three months later, on 30 August 1937, Rewald received what one source describes as an "official invitation" from Heiner Rau, a former member of the Prussian State parliament who was now a political exile from Hitler's version of Germany. Earlier during 1937 Rau had become a political commissar with the XI International Brigade in Spain (of which by 1938 he had become overall brigade commander). Rau's invitation was that she should travel to Spain for an extensive study-visit at the "Ernst Thälmann children's home" which his communist brigade had created in Madrid. Rau made his thinking very clear: “The situation of these children is extraordinary and – we believe – it deserves to be immortalised in a fine book and to be known by everyone. We know about your special interest in writing for children and we think you are an author capable of writing the book in question. So we invite and implore you to live for a few months among our children, to study their situations, and to write a fine book on the subject”.

In October 1937, by which time Anja was five months old, Rewald felt able to entrust her infant daughter to Louise Pollnow, described variously as a nanny and/or a friend, while Rewald made her way to Madrid in response to Rau's invitation. She remained in the Spanish capital and the surrounding region until February 1938. (Note: According to some sources she only spent three months in Madrid, but that finding appears to have been superseded by later investigations.) Those months were marked by a frenzy of activity during which she met dozens of children, won their trust engaged in endless discussions and compiled copious notes. She also wrote numerous articles and reports some of which found their way into the Parus Communist press. One institution on which she focused was indeed the "Ernst Thälmann children's home". Four of the children accommodated here were a group of boys, aged between 12 and 14, of whom she had already learned from her husband. On 16 June 1937 to four had turned up in the camp near Cordoba in the south in which Schaul was stationed. They had escaped from their homes at Peñarroya, a little mining town which had already been over-run by Falangist (pro-Franco) forces, and they had somehow managed to find a way across the lines to join up with their fathers who were fighting in the republican (pro-government). Schaul, who had worked as a free-lance photographer in Paris, befriended the boys and photographed. He had very quickly conceived the idea of incorporating their stories as episodes in a children's book of the kind in which his wife specialised. He had naturally shared his ideas in a letter home.

Arriving back in Paris in February 1938, Rewald applied herself to the book, which she completed as the summer ended. During 1938, however, there was a change of government, and the international priority for the new prime minister, Édouard Daladier was to follow the example of the British government under Neville Chamberlain and do nothing that might annoy the German government. In retrospect the policy became demonised in French and British historiographies as one of "appeasement (though it also provided opportunities for Anglo-French rearmament). “Vier spanische Jungen" (‘’"Four Spanish Boys"’’) was probably Rewald's best book to date, but she was unable to find a publisher for it. Thanks to the Gestapo the manuscript nevertheless survived. Rewald assets, including her manuscripts, notes, letters and photographs were confiscated in 1942, and carefully boxed up by unknown hands. After 1945 they were found by members of the Red army and conserved in Soviet archives. In 1957 they were returned to East Germany as a gesture of fraternal solidarity on behalf of the new leadership in Moscow. They were now stored safely in the national archives collection at Potsdam. That is where they were discovered during the 1980s by a young West German researcher called Dirk Krüger who was looking for a topic for his doctoral dissertation. Following Krüger's discovery Ruth Rewald's final novel was published more than forty years after the author's death, in a German-language version, in 1987.

=== War ===
In September 1939 Poland was invaded from the west by Germany and, two weeks later, from the east by the Soviet Union. The French and British government reacted promptly to the first invasion with declarations of war against Germany, but on the streets of Paris (and of London) there were few obvious changes for more than six months. That was not the case for Communists and/or Jews who had fled from Germany during the previous six years, however. Thousands were identified as enemy aliens and detained. Hans Schaul was arrested during or shortly before December 1939 and detained at Saint-Jean-de-la-Ruelle near Orléans. He spent the next four years in a succession of internment camps. Rewald was not arrested, possibly because she was the mother of a small child. She moved during the autumn/fall of 1939 to an address just outside Saint-Anne-de-Campbon (subsequently renamed "Sainte-Anne-sur-Brivet"). They lodged with a couple called Louis and Albertine Renaud. It is not clear when they arrived, and there are one or two ambiguous indications in subsequent correspondence between the couple that Hans may initially have accompanied them, meaning that they briefly lived together as tenants of the Renauds until his arrest. The village where Rewald and her infant daughter lived was in the extreme west of France, close to the important port installations at Saint-Nazaire. Ruth was still hoping that it might somehow be possible to take a passage with her daughter to the United States of America, but her hopes remained unfulfilled. In May/June France was invaded by German forces and the northern half of the country, together with the country's entire Atlantic coast was placed under German military administration. A strip of land along and close to the coast was declared a military zone, and access to it was subjected to special restrictions. Rewald and her daughter were required to relocate again. In November 1940 they relocated to Les Rosiers-sur-Loire, some distance inland, but still close to the Loire. Their accommodation was in a house which Rewald, in letters to her husband, referred to as their chateau. It was, indeed, quite old, consisting of two rooms. There was a kitchen and a living room. The building was precariously positioned alongside the road towards Angers which (despite a subsequent downgrading in terms of nomenclature) still runs along the top of a levee (dyke) constructed to protect the countryside between Angers and Tours from the risk of flooding. For Rewald money and food were constant preoccupations, but she was able to feed herself and her daughter with a varied range of vegetables grown on the land beside to "chateau". When strawberries were in season during 1941 and 1942 she was even able to grow enough to sell a surplus of these fruits. There was no scope for growing apples or producing milk or meat, however, and much of her time was spent scouring the farms in the region, accompanied by her daughter, trying to find these commodities at affordable prices.

=== Death ===
On 17 July 1942 Ruth Rewald was arrested by officers of the German security service, supported by French police. The arrest came in the context of the so-called Vel' d'Hiv Roundup, a mass-arrest of non-French Jewish families in France. On 20 July she was placed on a train destined for the death camp at Auschwitz/Oświęcim in Silesia. Her final post card to her husband (who by this time was interned in Algeria) is dated 18 July 1942 (Note: Several sources give the date of Rewald's arrest as 17 June 1942, but this, though oft repeated, appears to result from a misreading. The text of her final card to her husband indicates a sense of hopeless resignation: „Mein lieber Hans! Es ist soweit. Ich fahre zur Erntearbeit, ich weiß noch nicht wo … Ich glaube nicht, daß du so bald Nachricht bekommst … Außer der Trennung von Anja wird mir nichts etwas ausmachen … Dir alles Gute! Ruth” ”Darling Hans! The time has come. I’m off for harvest work, I don’t know where … I don’t believe you will get any more news [of me] any time soon … Apart from being separated from Anja, it's not such a bog deal … All good things to you! Ruth.) and carries a postmark from "Angers/Maine-et-Loire". Ruth Rewald was 36.

Anja had enrolled at the little primary school at Les Rosiers towards the end of 1941. During the immediate aftermath of her mother's arrest she was looked after by a neighbour. Then in October 1942, her teacher at the school, Renée Le Moine, took the child into her home. Anja wrote regularly to her father. Mlle. Le Moine was a keen photographer who loved to capture images of Anja's childhood, which was thereby unusually well recorded during these final years of her life. She preserved these carefully, and in 1995 was proud to show them to Daniel Queyroi, the history teacher from the school who visited her during her retirement at Saumur, and who was leading a major research project on Anja Schaul. The child lived with Mlle. Le Moine for approximately eighteen months. Then, on 26 January 1944, German police turned up at the school and arrested her in front of her classmates. She was taken to the Drancy internment camp near Paris, which had become a collection point for Jews (and others) arrested in France for onward transportation to the death camps in the east. Anja Schaul was one of those conveyed "Convoi n° 68" a train that left Drancy for Auschwitz on 10 February 1944. Her death date is recorded as 15 February 1944, which is believed to correspond with the date on which the train arrived at Auschwitz/Oświęcim.

== Output (selection) ==
=== Novels for children and young people ===
- 1932: Müllerstrasse. Jungens von heute.
- 1933: Achtung – Renate!
- 1934: Janko, der Junge aus Mexiko
- 1936: Tsao und Jing-Ling – Kinderleben in China
- 1938: Vier spanische Jungen (first published 1987, Röderberg-Verlag Köln, ISBN 3-87682-838-4)

=== Short stories for children and young people ===
- 1931: Rudi und sein Radio
- 1932: Der Roller
- 1933: Bittere oder süße Mandeln
- 1933: Wie Gerda zu ihrer Puppe kam
