= Prix Femina essai =

French literary prize

The prix Femina essai is a French literary prize awarded to an essay. Established in 1999, it replaced the Prix Hélène Vacaresco.

== List of laureates ==
Year		Author	Work	Publisher (x times)	Ref.
1999		Michel del Castillo	Colette, une certaine France	Gallimard	
2000		—N/a	No Winner		
2001		Elvire de Brissac	Ô dix-neuvième !	Grasset	
2002	nothumb	Michael A. Barry	Massoud	Louis Audibert	
2003	nothumb	Jean Hatzfeld	Une saison de machettes	Seuil	
2004		Roger Kempf	L'Indiscrétion des frères Goncourt	Grasset (2)	
2005		Thérèse Delpech	L'Ensauvagement	Grasset (3)	
2006		Claude Arnaud	Qui dit je en nous ? Une histoire subjective de l'identité	Grasset (4)	
2007	nothumb	Gilles Lapouge	L'Encre du voyageur	Albin Michel	
2009		Michelle Perrot	Histoire de chambres	Le Seuil (2)	
2010		Jean-Didier Vincent	Élisée Reclus. géographe, anarchiste, écologiste	Robert Laffont	
2011		Laure Murat	L'Homme qui se prenait pour Napoléon. Pour une histoire politique de la folie	Gallimard (2)	
2012	nothumb	Tobie Nathan	Ethno-roman	Grasset (5)	
2013	nothumb	Jean-Paul Enthoven and Raphaël Enthoven	Dictionnaire amoureux de Marcel Proust	Plon	
2014		Paul Veyne	Et dans l'éternité je ne m'ennuierai pas	Albin Michel (2)	
2015		Emmanuelle Loyer	Claude Lévi-Strauss	Flammarion	
2016		Ghislaine Dunant	Charlotte Delbo, la vie retrouvée	Grasset (6)	
2017		Jean-Luc Coatalem	Mes pas vont ailleurs	Stock	
2018		Élisabeth de Fontenay	Gaspard de la nuit	Stock (2)	
2019		Emmanuelle Lambert	Giono, furioso	Stock (3)	
2020		Christophe Granger	Joseph Kabris ou Les possibilités d'une vie	Anamosa	
2021	nothumb	Annie Cohen-Solal	Un étranger nommé Picasso	Fayard	
2022	nothumb	Annette Wieviorka	Tombeaux. Autobiographie de ma famille	Seuil (3)	
2023		Hugo Micheron	La Colère et l'oubli. Les démocraties face au jihadisme européen	Gallimard	
2024	nothumb	Paul Audi	Tenir tête	Stock	
2024	nothumb	Marc Weitzmann	La Part sauvage	Grasset	

== See also ==
- Prix Femina
- Prix Femina étranger
