= Levinas =

Levinas is a surname. Notable people with the surname include:

- Emmanuel Levinas (1906–1995), French philosopher
- Michaël Lévinas (born 1949), French composer, son of Emmanuel
- Danielle Cohen-Levinas (born 1959), French musicologist and philosopher, wife of Michaël

== See also ==
- Levina
- Levin (surname)
