= Henri Borlant =

French doctor, writer and Holocaust survivor (1927–2024)

- Born: Hirsch Borlant; 5 June 1927; Paris, France
- Died: 3 December 2024 (aged 97); Paris, France
- Occupation: Physician • Writer

Henri Borlant (né Hirsch Borland; 5 June 1927 – 3 December 2024) was a French doctor, writer, and Holocaust survivor.

== Biography ==
Born in the 10th arrondissement of Paris on 5 June 1927, Borlant's parents were French, non-practicing Jews. His father, Aron Borlant, was a tailor, and his mother, Rachel Beznos, was of Russian origin. He had eight brothers and sisters. He fled from Paris upon the French declaration of war on Germany, settling in Saint-Lambert-du-Lattay. He attended a Catholic school in the village and acquired his Certificat d'études primaires, subsequently becoming an apprentice mechanic.

On 15 July 1942, Borlant was arrested by the Gestapo and temporarily interned in Angers. He was deported to Auschwitz on 20 July 1942 with his brother Bernard, his sister Denise, and his father. His three relatives did not survive. He escaped from the Ohrdruf concentration camp with a friend and took refuge with an anti-Nazi butcher in Ohrdruf, shortly thereafter notifying the United States Army of the concentration camp.

After the war, Borlant returned to France and studied medicine, becoming a doctor. He married a German woman named Hella Holst. He gave his testimony about the Holocaust in the telefilm Les Survivants in 2005 and wrote an autobiography titled Merci d'avoir survécu in 2011.

Borlant died on 3 December 2024, at the age of 97.
