= Miguel Benasayag =

Argentine philosopher (born 1953)

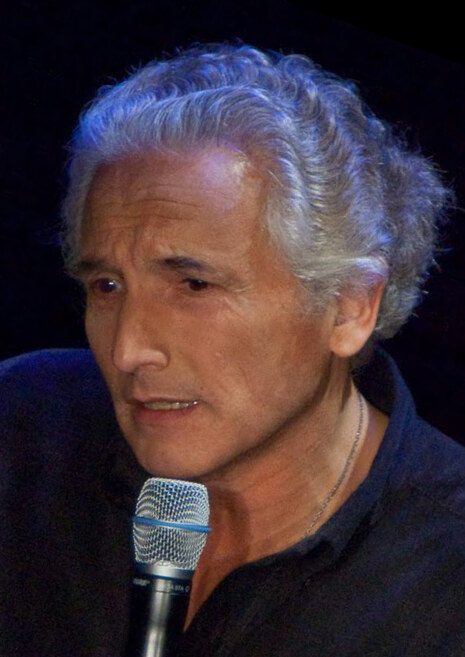
Miguel Benasayag

Miguel Benasayag (born 1953) is an Argentine philosopher, psychoanalyst, epistemology researcher and former Guévariste resistance fighter. He is close to the left-libertarian movement.

== Biography ==
Miguel Benasayag was born in Argentina, into a family he describes as "intellectual Jews".

Arrested three times, he fell the third time, was tortured, then having survived, he spent four years in prison. Following the murder of two French nuns by the junta, Benasayag was able to benefit, thanks to his dual Argentine-French nationality (his French mother had left France in 1939), from the program for the release of French prisoners in Argentina and to surrender thus in France in 1978, a country he did not know. He asserts that his release would have been the subject of a bargaining negotiated by Maurice Papon for the purchase by Argentina of French weapons.

He is the author in 1999 of the Manifesto of the alternative resistance network. From 2003 to 2007, he coordinated research on the experience of Médecins du Monde's methadone bus. In 2007, in France, he supported the candidacy of José Bové for the presidential election and signed a petition for the release of former members of Action Direct.

In 2010, he wrote for La Mèche and signed a column for the five of Villiers le bel after the riots of 2007 calling for the overthrow of the police qualified as "occupation army". For Philippe Bilger, this forum "does not even relate to the extreme left nor to a sulphurous leftism", but aims "at nothing less than to legitimize attempted murder".
