= Chanac =

- Commune
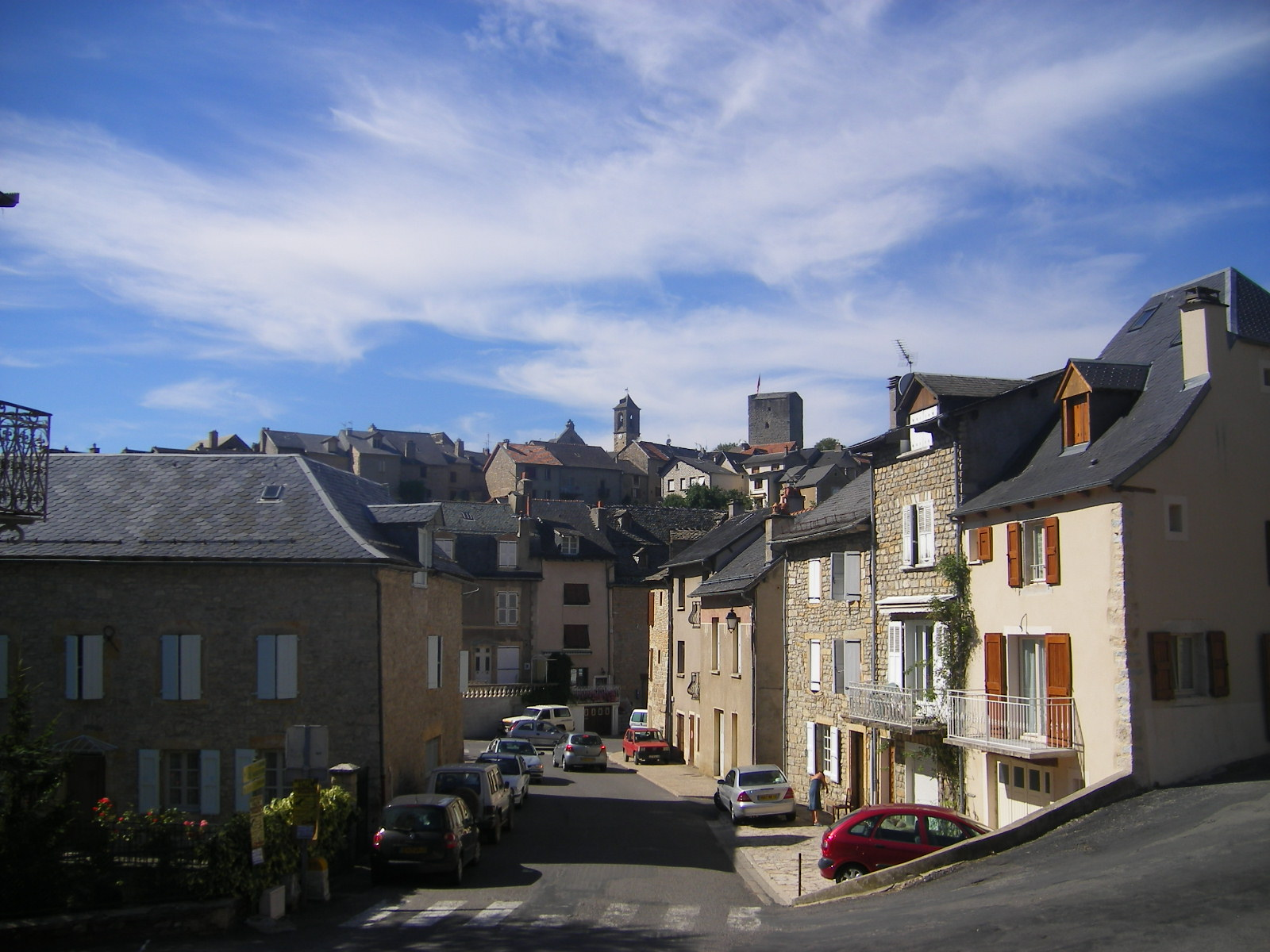
- A view within Chanac

- Coat of arms
- Location of Chanac
- Location within France Location within Occitanie
- Coordinates: 44°28′02″N 3°20′37″E
- Country: France
- Region: Occitania
- Department: Lozère
- Arrondissement: Mende
- Canton: La Canourgue
- Intercommunality: Aubrac Lot Causses Tarn

Government
  - Mayor (2020–2026): Philippe Rochoux
- Area^{1}: 71.14 km^{2} (27.47 sq mi)
- Elevation: 635 m (2,083 ft)
- Highest elevation: 1,004 m (3,294 ft)
- Lowest elevation: 612 m (2,008 ft)
- Population (2023): 1,404
  - Density: 19.74/km^{2} (51.12/sq mi)
- Time zone: UTC+01:00 (CET)
  - Summer (DST): UTC+02:00 (CEST)
- INSEE/Postal code: 48039 /48230
- ^{1} French Land Register data, which excludes lakes, ponds, glaciers > 1 km^{2} (0.386 sq mi or 247 acres) and river estuaries.

Chanac (French pronunciation: [ʃanak]) is a commune in the Lozère department in southern France.

== See also ==
- Communes of the Lozère department
