= Robert Mauzi =

French academic and author

Robert Mauzi (1927 – August 2006) was a French academic and author who studied and taught literature and thought, particularly that of 18th century France. He was born in Toulouse, attended then later taught at the Faculty of Arts in Lyon. Mauzi was named a full professor at the Sorbonne in 1969, and continued to serve there actively or as professor emeritus until his death.

His best known work was L’idée du bonheur dans la littérature et la pensée françaises au XVIIIe siècle (the idea of happiness in the literature and the French thought in the 18th century), published in 1960. This study gives some explanation to the prominence of the 'bonheur' or happiness in the works of Burlamaqui, and may explain why Jefferson chose to refer to the pursuit of happiness in the Declaration of Independence.
