= Brens, Tarn =

Brens
- Commune
- Coat of arms
- Location of Brens
- Location within France Location within Occitanie
- Coordinates: 43°53′25″N 1°54′40″E
- Country: France
- Region: Occitania
- Department: Tarn
- Arrondissement: Albi
- Canton: Gaillac
- Intercommunality: CA Gaillac-Graulhet

Government
  - Mayor (2020–2026): Sylvie Garcia
- Area^{1}: 22.79 km^{2} (8.80 sq mi)
- Elevation: 128 m (420 ft)
- Highest elevation: 196 m (643 ft)
- Lowest elevation: 103 m (338 ft)
- Population (2023): 2,423
  - Density: 106.3/km^{2} (275.4/sq mi)
- Time zone: UTC+01:00 (CET)
  - Summer (DST): UTC+02:00 (CEST)
- INSEE/Postal code: 81038 /81600
- ^{1} French Land Register data, which excludes lakes, ponds, glaciers > 1 km^{2} (0.386 sq mi or 247 acres) and river estuaries.

Brens (French pronunciation: [bʁɛ̃s]) is a commune in the Tarn department in southern France.

The commune is listed as a Village étape.

== Population ==
Historical population
Year	Pop.	±% p.a.
1968	1,274	—
1975	1,417	+1.53%
1982	1,394	−0.23%
1990	1,364	−0.27%
1999	1,598	+1.77%
2007	2,063	+3.24%
2012	2,223	+1.51%
2017	2,305	+0.73%
2023	2,423	+0.84%
Source: INSEE

== See also ==
- Communes of the Tarn department
