= Ackroyd =

Ackroyd is an English surname. Notable people with the surname include:

- Alan Ackroyd (born 1948), English rugby league footballer
- Albert Akroyd, English rugby league player
- Alfred Ackroyd (1858–1927), English cricketer
- Anthony Ackroyd (born 1958), Australian comedian, speaker and writer
- Archibald Ackroyd (1897–1968), English cricketer
- Barry Ackroyd (born 1954), English cinematographer
- Christa Ackroyd (born 1957), British journalist and broadcaster
- Christian Ackroyd (born 1974), former senior Army Officer, pilot and aviation leader.
- Sir Cuthbert Ackroyd, 1st Baronet (1892–1973), Lord Mayor of London 1955–56
- David Ackroyd (born 1940), American actor
- Harold Ackroyd (1877–1917), British Army medical officer, awarded the Victoria Cross
- Haughton Ackroyd (1894–1979), English footballer
- Heather Ackroyd, British visual artist, of Ackroyd & Harvey
- Jack Ackroyd (1926–1992), Canadian chief of police and civil servant
- Jane Ackroyd (born 1957), English sculptor
- Jenny Ackroyd (1950–2004), English vascular surgeon
- John Ackroyd (disambiguation), various people
- Joseph Ackroyd (1847–1915), New York politician
- Joyce Ackroyd (1918–1991), Australian academic, translator, author and editor
- Norman Ackroyd (1938–2024), English artist
- Peter Ackroyd (born 1949), English biographer, novelist and critic
- Peter Ackroyd (biblical scholar) (1917–2005), British Old Testament scholar
- Poppy Ackroyd (born 1982), British composer, pianist and violinist
- Thomas Raven Ackroyd (1861–1946), English bank manager and politician
- Timothy Ackroyd (born 1958), English actor

== See also ==
- The Murder of Roger Ackroyd, 1926 novel by Agatha Christie
- The Mrs Ackroyd Band, a band in Manchester, England
- Aykroyd
- Akroyd
