= Bill France =

Bill or William France may refer to:

- Bill France Sr. (1909–1992), nicknamed "Big Bill", the founder of NASCAR and its president from 1948 to 1971
- Bill France Jr. (1933–2007), nicknamed "Little Bill", son of Bill France, Sr., who ran NASCAR from 1972 to 2000
- William France Sr. (cabinetmaker) (1727–1773)
- William France Jr. (cabinetmaker) (1759–1838)
