= Akroyd =

Akroyd is an English surname. Notable people with the surname include:

- Annette Beveridge (née Akroyd; 1842–1929), British Orientalist
- Bayly Akroyd (1850–1926), English cricketer
- Edward Akroyd (1810–1887), English manufacturer
- Joe Akroyd, English loudspeaker manufacturer
- Swainson Akroyd (1848–1925), English cricketer

== See also ==
- Aykroyd
- Ackroyd
- Hornsby-Akroyd oil engine
