= Aykroyd =

Aykroyd is an English surname meaning 'dweller of the oak-clearing'. It is said to have originated in Yorkshire. Notable people with the surname include:

- Dan Aykroyd (born 1952), Canadian comedian, actor, screenwriter and musician; brother of Peter
- Harold Ackroyd VC MC (1877–1917), British soldier, recipient of the Victoria Cross
- James P. Aykroyd (1810−1835), early American composer, music teacher, musician
- Juliet Aykroyd, British actress and writer
- Peter Aykroyd (1955−2021), Canadian comedian, actor, screenwriter and musician; brother of Dan
- William Aykroyd, 1st Baronet OStJ (1865−1947), English woollen and carpet manufacturer
- Tabitha "Tabby" Aykroyd (c.1771–1855), domestic servant and lifelong friend of the Brontë family

== See also ==
- Aykroyd Baronets
- Ackroyd
- Akroyd
