= John Frederick France =

John Frederick France F.R.C.S. Eng., JP (15 December 1817 – 6 October 1900 at St Leonards-on-Sea, Sussex) was the Ophthalmic Surgeon at Guy's Hospital from 1847 until 1849.

== Career ==
He received his medical education at Guy's Hospital, entering as a medical student in 1835. He immediately distinguished himself and in 1838 received the prize in surgery at the Physical Society. Next year he gained the Silver Medal for Ophthalmic Surgery and became M.R.C.S. Eng. in 1840.

Shortly afterwards he was appointed Assistant ophthalmic surgeon to the school. In 1847, he succeeded the late Mr John Morgan as lecturer on Ophthalmic Surgery at the school. He retired from active service at Guys in 1861 and was appointed Consulting Ophthalmic Surgeon. In 1855 he was elected a Fellow of the Royal College of Surgeons; he was also a Fellow of the Society of Antiquaries and JP for Middlesex, London and Westminster.

France edited, with notes, the second edition of Morgan's work on Lectures on Diseases of the Eye (1848) and was a voluminous writer himself on Ophthalmic subjects. To the ‘Guys Hospital Reports’ he contributed 17 papers between 1848 and 1861, and numerous other papers appeared in various periodical publications. Examples of these were:

- On Syphilitic Blotch of the Conjunctiva.
- Case of Diabetic Cataract. (1858) – France was one of the authors who supported the theory of causal connection between diabetes and cataract, which at that time was still questioned by many physicians.
- On the use of Forceps in Extraction of Cataract. – France used for fixation of the eyeball, a simple artery forceps (without spring lock) in 27 patients and had success in all of them.

France also published clinical observations about eye injuries, paralysis of the pupil and ptosis. GHR (V, page 26, VI, page 24, page 243, 1847–8) In the same journal (October 1845) he reported about the successful extraction of a traumatic calcified cataract from the anterior chamber. (Lancet 1850,1,14)

== Personal ==
He used the leisure time of his somewhat withdrawn life for scholarly studies and for charity. France was one of the earliest supporters of Epsom College and was an active member of its council until ill health prevented his attendance. He was a Vice-President of the school. He was also greatly interested in the Royal Asylum of St Anne's Schools, and was always in attendance at the council meetings. In his last four years he purchased ten life presentations for girls to St Anne's and presented them to the governing body of Epsom College for necessitous orphan daughters of medical men of not less than five years' practice. The cost of these amounted to the sum of £12,000. He was also a Vice-President of the British Medical Benevolent Fund, and a generous donor to it.

In June 1874, John F France, offered to provide a chapel for the proposed Kensington Workhouse, 'to be erected free of all cost to the Guardians'. His wife, Eliza France, had previously left £2,500 in her will for this specific purpose. There is also a stained glass window in the Lady Chapel of Chichester Cathedral dedicated to France, his wife and their two children Beatrice and Bernard. It is the easternmost window on the south side.

After his retirement France lived for many years at 2 Norfolk Terrace, Westbourne Grove, and died at St Leonards-on-Sea on Oct 6th, 1900. His funeral took place in Chichester Cathedral. By his will this much-respected philanthropist, whose fine motto had been 'May God me guide', left some £25,000 for the public use, and subject to this and some smaller legacies the residuary estate was left in trust for the Royal Medical Benevolent College at Epsom. He also compiled and edited Preces Veterum, cum Hymnis Coaevis, second edition (I887).

John Frederick France was the son of William Beckwith France (Deputy Lieutenant) of Cadogan Place, Chelsea and grandson of William France Jnr (cabinetmaker).
