= Patricia Shaw =

Patricia Shaw may refer to:

- Patricia Alice Shaw (born 1946), Canadian linguist
- Patricia Shaw (novelist) (1928–2024), Australian novelist
- Patricia Batty Shaw (1928–2004), chairwoman of the United Kingdom's National Federation of Women's Institutes
- Patty Hearst (born 1954), celebrity kidnap victim now known as Patricia Hearst Shaw
