= Capture of Westhoek =

- Part of The Third Battle of Ypres, in the First World War
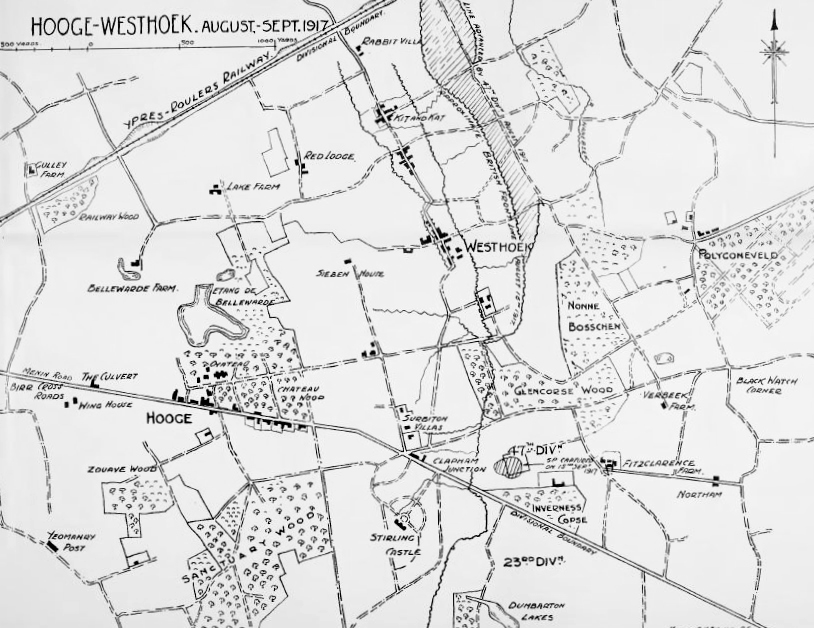
- Gheluvelt Plateau: Inverness Copse, Westhoek and Glencorse Wood
Date	10 August 1917
Location	West Flanders, Belgium 50°50′37″N 02°58′18.6″E
Result	German victory

Belligerents
United Kingdom	German Empire

Commanders and leaders
Sir Douglas Haig	Crown Prince Rupprecht

Strength
2 divisions	6 regiments

Casualties and losses
25th Division: 1,291; 18th (Eastern) Division: 1,526; (31 July – 10 August)	4th Army: 16,000 (1–10 August)
- German casualties were counted in ten-day periods.
- Gheluvelt Plateau: Hooge, Inverness Copse and Glencorse Wood

The Capture of Westhoek (West corner, 10 August 1917) took place on the Gheluvelt Plateau near Ypres in Belgium, during the Third Battle of Ypres (31 July – 10 November 1917), in the First World War. The British Fifth Army attacked the Gheluvelt Plateau at the Battle of Pilckem Ridge (31 July – 2 August) but the German 4th Army had fortified its positions in the Ypres Salient since the Second Battle of Ypres (22 April – 25 May 1915). The British reached the first objective in the south and the second objective on the northern flank, losing some ground to German counter-attacks. A British attack due on 2 August was postponed because torrential rain from the afternoon of 31 July until 5 August washed out the battlefield.

The ground had been churned by artillery-fire into sloughs of mud, flooded shell craters, fallen trees and barbed wire. After several postponements, the attack was set for 10 August. British artillery fired a preparatory bombardment from Polygon Wood to Langemarck for the main attack due on 14 August but the German guns concentrated on the Gheluvelt Plateau. British counter-battery fire was hampered by low cloud and rain, which made air observation extremely difficult and shells were wasted on empty gun emplacements. Fresh divisions took over by 4 August but the front line troops had to be relieved every 48 hours, which exhausted all of the infantry by 10 August. The German 52nd Reserve Division, which had not been relieved after 31 July and the 54th Division, that had taken over on the northern flank of the Plateau by 4 August, were also exhausted.

The British attack on the right flank began well and some troops quickly reached their objectives. The 74th Brigade of the 25th Division on the left flank advanced fast and reached its objectives by 5:30 a.m. The Germans in Westhoek were rushed but on the right flank, sniping and attacks by German aircraft caused an increasing number of British casualties. German artillery began an SOS barrage at 6.00 a.m., from Stirling Castle to Westhoek. The foremost British infantry were cut off in the open and counter-attacked. Around 7:00 p.m., fresh German infantry advanced behind a smokescreen and by nightfall, Inverness Copse and most of Glencorse Wood had been recaptured.

The 25th Division held on around Westhoek but lost 158 men killed, 1,033 wounded and more than 100 missing. The defeat of the 18th (Eastern) Division at Inverness Copse, Fitzclarence Farm and Glencorse Wood left German snipers and machine-gunners free to fire into the right flank of the 25th Division. German counter-attacks continued into the night but communication by SOS rockets, daylight lamps, carrier pigeons and runners enabled the British artillery accurately to bombard German troops as they assembled.

== Background ==
=== Topography ===
Ypres is overlooked by Kemmel Hill in the south-west and from the east by low hills running south-west to north-east, with Wytschaete (Wijtschate) and Hill 60 to the south of Verbrandenmolen, Hooge, Polygon Wood and Passchendaele (Passendale). Wytschaete is 7,000 yd (4.0 mi; 6.4 km) from Ypres, at Hollebeke the ridge is 4,000 yd (2.3 mi; 3.7 km) distant and recedes to 7,000 yd (4.0 mi; 6.4 km) at Polygon Wood. Wytschaete is the highest point, about 150 ft (46 m) above the plain; on the Ypres–Menin road at Hooge, the elevation is about 100 ft (30 m) and 70 ft (21 m) at Passchendaele. The rises are slight, apart from the vicinity of Zonnebeke, which has a gradient of 1:33. From Hooge and to the east, the slope is 1:60 and near Hollebeke, it is 1:75. The heights are subtle and resemble a saucer lip around the city. The main ridge has spurs sloping east and the spur at Wytschaete, runs 2 mi (3.2 km) south-east to Messines, with a gentle slope to the east and a 1:10 decline to the west. Further south is the muddy valley of the Douve river, Ploegsteert Wood (Plugstreet to the British) and Hill 63. West of Messines Ridge is the parallel Wulverghem (Spanbroekmolen) Spur, with the Oosttaverne Spur, also parallel, further to the east. The general aspect south and east of Ypres is one of low ridges and dips, gradually flattening northwards beyond Passchendaele into a featureless plain.

Possession of the higher ground to the south and east of Ypres gives ample scope for ground observation, enfilade fire and converging artillery bombardments. An occupier also has the advantage that the movement of artillery, reinforcements, supplies and stores can be screened from view. The ridge had woods from Wytschaete to Zonnebeke giving good cover, some being of notable size like Polygon Wood and those later named Battle Wood, Shrewsbury Forest and Sanctuary Wood. In 1914, the woods usually had undergrowth but by 1917, artillery bombardments had reduced the woods to tree stumps, shattered tree trunks and barbed wire, tangled on the ground and a mass of shell-holes; the fields in gaps between the woods were 800–1,000 yd (730–910 m) wide and devoid of cover. Most roads in this area were unpaved, except for the main ones from Ypres, with occasional villages and houses built along them. In 1914, the lowland west of the ridge had been a mixture of meadow and fields, with high hedgerows dotted with trees, cut by streams and ditches emptying into canals. The main road to Ypres from Poperinge to Vlamertinge is in a defile, easily observed from the ridge.

== Prelude ==
=== German preparations ===
==== Fortification ====
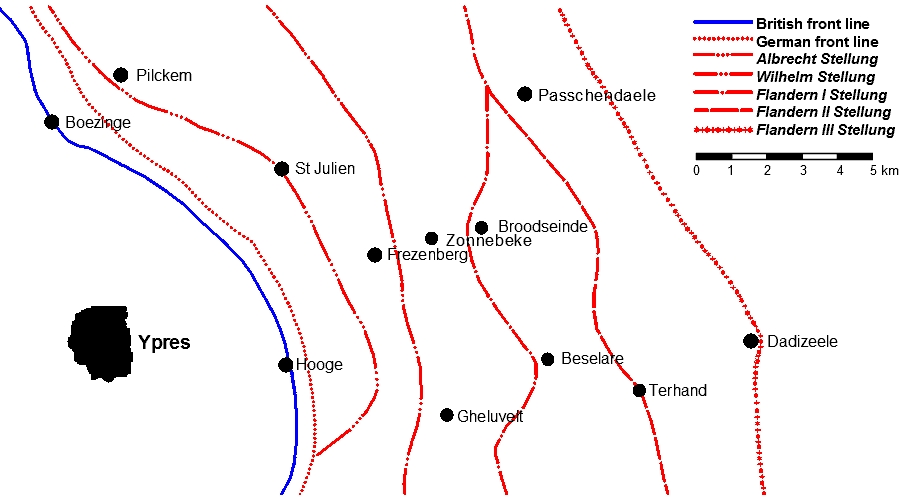
The British front line and the German defences in the area east of Ypres, mid-1917

The 4th Army (General Friedrich Sixt von Armin) was responsible for defence of the Western Front from Lille to the North Sea, which included the Ypres Salient. In early 1917, German corps had been renamed Gruppen based on a corps headquarters, with fresh divisions coming under command as tired ones were withdrawn rather than the previous permanent establishment of divisions. The IX Reserve Corps became Gruppe Wijtschate and held a 6 mi (9.7 km) front south of the Menin road with three divisions holding the front line (Stellungsdivisionen) and three Eingreif (specially trained counter-attack) divisions in reserve. The III Bavarian Corps was renamed Gruppe (group) Ypres and held 6 mi (9.7 km) of front, from the Menin road to the Gheluvelt plateau and Pilckem to the north, with three front divisions and two Eingreif divisions. The Eingreif divisions were kept out of sight behind the Menin and Passchendaele ridges and 5 mi (8.0 km) further back were four more Eingreif divisions; 7 mi (11 km) beyond were another two divisions in army group reserve.

The Germans were apprehensive of a British attempt to exploit the victory over Gruppe Wijtschate at Messines, with an advance to the Tower Hamlets (Bassevillebeek) spur beyond the north end of the ridge. Since early 1917, there had been three German defensive positions behind the front line. The Albrechtstellung ran from Bixschoote in the north, behind Pilckem Ridge and south across the Gheluvelt Plateau. The Wilhemstellung began at Langemarck, ran south to Gravenstafel then crossed the Gheluvelt Plateau to Zandvoorde, east of Messines Ridge. The Flandernstellung (Flanders Position) had been built earlier in the year, along Passchendaele Ridge, south across Gheluvelt Plateau behind Polygon Wood, in front of Becelaere, across the Menin road and south to the Lys (Leie) river. Because of the flat ground and high water table hundreds of pillboxes and blockhouses rather than deep dugouts, had been built above ground and camouflaged with mud and turf. The many stone farmhouses dotted around had also been fortified; from two to forty men could be accommodated in the concrete and steel shelters, immune to anything smaller than a hit by an 8-inch shell.

On 9 June, Rupprecht proposed withdrawing to the Flandernstellung in the area east of Messines; construction of defences began but were terminated on 14 June after Colonel Fritz von Loßberg was appointed as the new Chief of Staff of the 4th Army. Loßberg rejected the withdrawal to the Flandernstellung and ordered that the front line be held rigidly. The Flandernstellung, along Passchendaele Ridge east of the Wilhemstellung, would become the Flandern I Stellung and a new Flandern II Stellung would branch off north of Passchendaele run south through Terhand and west of Menin to the Lys. Construction of Flandern III Stellung from Moorslede to Westroosebeke, behind Passchendaele Ridge to Dadizeele and west of Menin on the Lys was also begun. By July, the area east of Ypres was defended by the front position, the Albrechtstellung (second position), Wilhelmstellung (third position), Flandern I Stellung (fourth position), Flandern II Stellung (fifth position) and Flandern III Stellung (sixth position, under construction).

Debate among the German commanders continued and on 25 June, Ludendorff suggested that Gruppe Ypern be withdrawn to the Wilhelmstellung, leaving only outposts in the Albrechtstellung. On 30 June, Kuhl suggested a withdrawal to the Flandern I Stellung along Passchendaele Ridge, meeting the old front line near Langemarck to the north and Armentières in the south. A withdrawal would avoid a hasty retreat from Pilckem Ridge and force the British into a time-consuming redeployment. Loßberg disagreed, because the British would launch a broad front attack, making a local withdrawal pointless, the ground east of theOosttaverne line was easy to defend, Menin Road Ridge could be held and that Pilckem Ridge deprived the British of ground observation over the Steenbeek valley, while German observation of the area from Passchendaele Ridge allowed infantry to be supported by observed artillery fire.

==== Infantry organisation ====
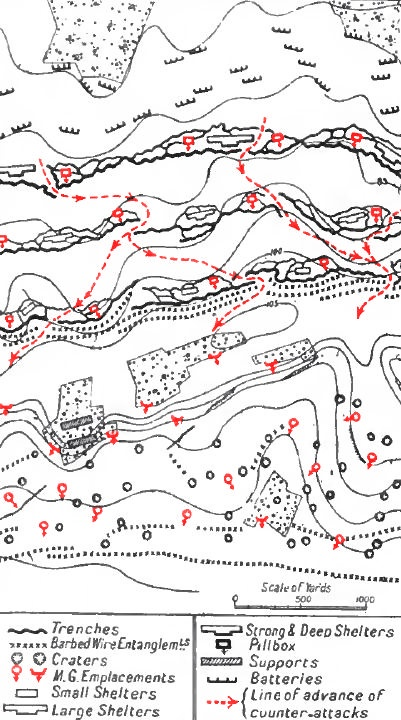
German defensive system, Flanders, mid-1917

The 4th Army operation order for the defensive battle was issued on 27 June. The system of defence in depth began with a front system (first line) with breastworks Ia, Ib and Ic, about 200 yd (180 m) apart, garrisoned by the four companies of each front battalion with listening-posts in no-man's-land. About 2,000 yd (1,800 m) behind these works, was the forward battle zone (Kampffeld) backed by the Albrechtstellung (second or artillery protective line). The support battalions comprised a Sicherheitsbesatzung company to hold strong-points and three Stoßtruppen (storm companies) to counter-attack from the back of the Kampffeld, half based in the pillboxes of the Albrechtstellung to provide a framework for the re-establishment of defence in depth, once an attack had been repulsed. Dispersed in front of the line were divisional Scharfschützen (Sharpshooter) machine-gun nests, called the Stützpunktlinie (strongpoint line).

The Albrechtstellung marked the front of the main battle zone (Grosskampffeld) which was about 2,000 yd (1.1 mi; 1.8 km) deep, containing most of the field artillery of the front divisions, behind which was the Wilhelmstellung (third line); in its pillboxes the reserve battalions of the front-line regiments were held back for counter-attacks. From the Wilhelmstellung back to Flandern I Stellung was a rearward battle zone (rückwärtiges Kampffeld) containing support and reserve assembly areas for the Eingreif divisions. The failures at Verdun in December 1916 and at Arras in April 1917, had given more importance to these areas, since the Kampffeld had been overrun during both offensives and the garrisons lost. It was anticipated that the main defensive engagement would take place in the Grosskampffeld with the reserve regiments and Eingreif divisions advancing against attackers who had been slowed and depleted by the forward garrisons.

... they will have done their duty so long as they compel the enemy to use up his supports, delay his entry into the position, and disorganise his waves of attack.

— Generalleutnant William Balck

The leading regiment of an Eingreif division was to advance into the zone of the front division (stellungsdivision), with its other two regiments moving forward in close support. Eingreif divisions were accommodated 10,000–12,000 yd (5.7–6.8 mi; 9.1–11.0 km) behind the front line and began their advance to assembly areas in the rückwärtiges Kampffeld, ready to intervene in the Grosskampffeld with an instant-immediate counter-thrust (den sofortigen Gegenstoß). Loßberg rejected elastic defence in Flanders, because there was little prospect of operational pauses between British attacks because the British had so much artillery and ammunition. A trench garrison which retired quickly became disorganised and could not counter-attack, losing the sector and leaving the flanks of neighbouring formations in the air. Loßberg ordered that the front line was to be fought for at all costs, with immediate counter-attacks to recapture lost sectors.

Front line troops were not expected to cling to shelters but leave them as soon as the battle began, moving forward and to the flanks to avoid artillery-fire and to counter-attack. German infantry equipment had recently been improved by the arrival of 36 MG 08/15 machine-guns (tactical equivalent of the British Lewis gun) per regiment. The Trupp of eight men was augmented by a MG 08/15 crew of four men, to become a Gruppe, the Trupp becoming a Stoßtrupp. The extra firepower gave German infantry more means for fire and manoeuvre tactics; 60 per cent of the front line garrison were formed into Stoßtruppen and the other 40 per cent were concentrated in Stoßgruppen, in the forward battle zone. The Albrechtstellung contained 80 per cent of the Stoßkompanien and Stoßbatallione in divisional reserve and the local Eingreif division (composed of Stoß formations), was based in the rear positions.

=== 1–9 August ===
Weather 31 July – 10 August 1917
Date	Rain mm	°F	°C	
31	21.7	69	21	dull
1	21.5	59	15	—
2	5.3	59	15	—
3	9.9	59	15	—
4	4.9	66	19	dull
5	0.0	73	23	fire
6	0.1	71	22	dull
7	0.0	69	21	dull
8	10.2	71	22	dull
9	0.2	68	20	fine
10	1.5	69	21	clear

After II Corps reported at 5:43 p.m. that it was close to the second objective, Gough ordered that II Corps was to attack again on 2 August. At 8:45 p.m. the order was altered, to make certain that the second objective had been captured before the four corps further north attacked again. On 1 August, Brigadier-General John Davidson, the Director of Operations at BEF HQ, recommended that the attack by II Corps should not be rushed and that fresh divisions should be used for the attack. Davidson also suggested that attacks should wait for two to three days of clear weather, to exploit the observation points gained on 31 July and two captured maps which showed the positions of camouflaged machine-gun nests. Davidson argued that it was vital for II Corps to secure the Gheluvelt Plateau. The Fifth Army corps commanders agreed that taking the area from Inverness Copse to Westhoek would not be enough. The priority given to the defence of the plateau by the German 4th Army meant that a big counter-attack to restore the front line must be expected. Rupprecht made a diary entry,

...the results of the day's fighting were all the more satisfactory because the counter-attack divisions of Gruppe Wijtschate behind Gheluvelt Plateau had scarcely been used.

— Rupprecht (Diary 31 July)

in an order on 5 August, Gruppe Wijtschate announced that

...the enemy cannot continue his intended breakthrough...until he has gained freedom for his right flank by pressing back the 52nd Reserve Division on Gheluvelt Plateau....The next blow may therefore be expected to be delivered with the utmost strength against the 52nd Reserve and 12th Divisions.

— Gruppe Wijtschate

The rain that began on 31 July continued for three days and turned the ground into a morass about 4,000 yd (2.3 mi; 3.7 km) wide behind the new British front line. The banks of streams became bogs with few crossing-places, easily visible from German positions and frequently bombarded, especially on the Gheluvelt Plateau, which delayed the consolidation of the captured ground. Troops who deviated from the tracks could drown and roads were covered in mud and full of shell craters 3–4 ft (0.91–1.22 m) deep and the conditions exhausted rapidly the British troops in the front line. On 2 August, the Tank Corps recommended that the tanks should be withheld and it was agreed that they would not be used again until a dry spell. On 2 August the resumption of the offensive was postponed and on 4 August, it stopped raining and on 5 August but remained dull and stormy, with no sunshine or a drying wind and more rain expected. The Fifth Army HQ set 9 August for the II Corps attack and the main offensive to begin again on 13 August. The weather remained dull and misty until the evening of 8 August when thunder and heavy rain returned the battlefront to a swamp and the attack on the plateau was postponed until 4:35 a.m. on 10 August. On the night of 9/10 August, both sides increased the volume of artillery-fire; several soldiers from British patrols were taken prisoner by the Germans and gave away the II Corps attack.

=== British preparations ===
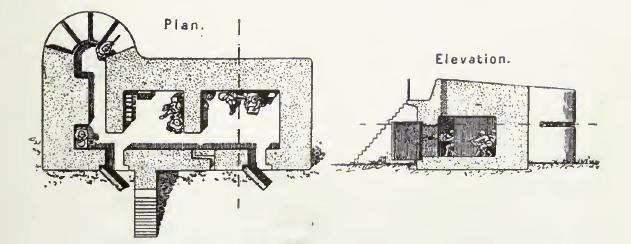
German pillbox, Flanders 1917

The power of the German artillery behind the Gheluvelt Plateau after 31 July was undiminished and a continuous bombardment was maintained on the front line and rear areas of II Corps. The counter-battery artillery of the Fifth Army fired on German artillery positions along the width of the army front, ready for the general attack due after the II Corps operation on the Gheluvelt Plateau. The British guns often bombarded the wrong artillery positions because of a lack of air reconnaissance to track the moves of German artillery in the bad weather. The British failed to achieve artillery superiority over the German artillery behind the plateau, which made the completion of new battery positions a long and costly effort that took until 8 August. Casualties in men and guns were so high that on 4 August, many British batteries were reduced to half strength. The state of the ground was so bad that gunners had to live in shell holes. New plank roads to carry ammunition forward could easily be seen by German artillery observers and wagon drivers and carrying parties moved only at night, dodging German bombardments which frequently included mustard gas. Amidst the rain and mud, the delivery of supplies and the passage of troops across the beaten zone extremely dangerous and caused a constant drain of casualties.

The 7th and 75th brigades of the 25th Division (Major-General Guy Bainbridge) had waited about 2,000 yd (1.1 mi; 1.8 km) behind the front line, ready to pass through the 8th Division to continue the advance. The brigades were not needed as the advance on the Gheluvelt Plateau was held up at the first and second objectives by the Germans. On 1 August, the 8th Division was replaced by the 7th and 75th brigades of the 25th Division until 4 August, which were then relieved by the 74th Brigade along the Westhoek and Bellewaarde ridges. Because of the continuous rain, troops in the front line being replaced every 48 hours, as preparations were made for the next attack. The 30th Division was relieved by the 55th and 54th brigades of the 18th (Eastern) Division on 4 August. The 24th Division was not due to attack and remained in the line and took over the front northwards close to Stirling Castle to narrow the attack frontage of the 18th (Eastern) Division. The fresh divisions had to remain close to the front for more than a week before zero hour and were rapidly exhausted by the conditions.

=== British plan ===
The infantry were to advance behind a creeping barrage at 4:35 a.m., straight through to the second objective (black line) of 31 July, to capture the Albrechtstellung, Inverness Copse and Glencorse Wood across the neck of the plateau. The speed of the barrage gave the 18th (Eastern) Division 46 minutes and the 25th Division 25 minutes to complete the attack. On 8 August, Inverness Copse and Glencorse Wood were each bombarded with 3,000 medium and heavy shells and bombarded again on 9 August, the first bright day since July. The 18th (Eastern) Division attack by the 55th Brigade was to be on a battalion front of about 400 yd (370 m) and the 54th Brigade was to attack with two battalions forward on a front 800 yd (730 m) wide. The 74th Brigade of the 25th Division was to attack with its four battalions on the left flank, each on a 400 yd (370 m) front, to recapture the Albrechtstellung, Westhoek and the rest of Westhoek Ridge. By aggressive patrolling, part of the objective on the left centre had already been occupied by 10 August.

== Battle ==
=== 18th (Eastern) Division ===
==== 55th Brigade ====
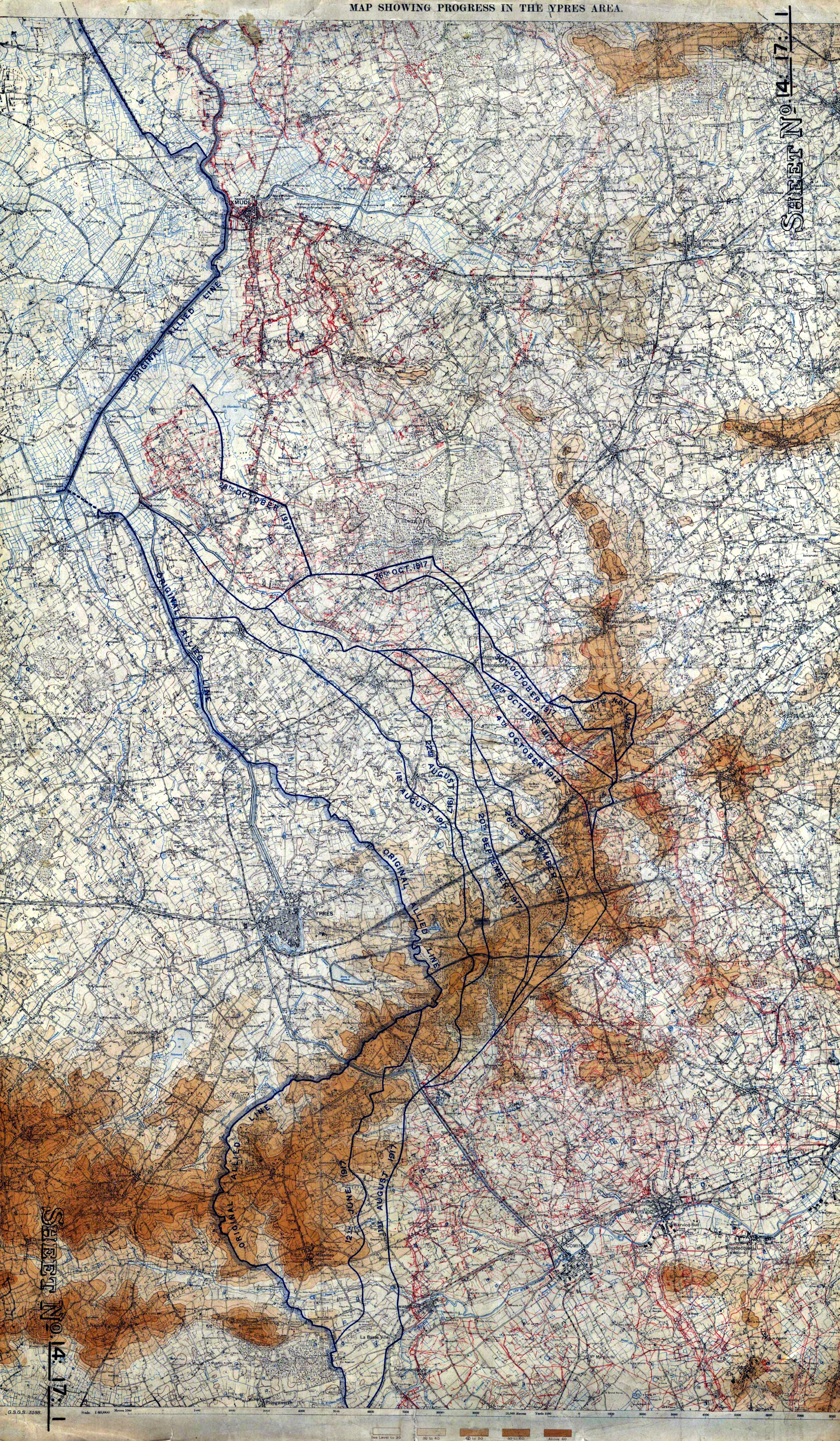
Map showing topography and locations in the Ypres district, detailing British and French advances at Ypres, 1917

In the moonlight, German sentries had seen the right flank companies of the 7th Battalion, Queen's Regiment of the 55th Brigade battalion crossing Stirling Castle Ridge to the start line at 1:30 a.m. The Germans had set up advanced posts and some of the Queen's strayed into them as they lurked forwards in the dark. The Germans sent up green SOS rockets and the covering artillery replied at once. The right and right-centre companies were severely bombarded and lost many casualties, leaving many gaps. Just after 6:00 a.m., German field guns and machine-guns began to barrage the Queen's start line and from Stirling Castle north to Westhoek, cutting off the British infantry from supplies and reinforcements.

The advance on the right flank "sagged from the beginning" under massed small-arms fire from the front and the southern flank from Jasper Avenue, from which few men escaped. The survivors took cover in shell-holes and later made their way back to the British line in ones and twos. The rear waves were obstructed by tree trunks, uncut wire and mud and could not catch up and fill the gaps. A few men got into Jasper Avenue but could not roll up the Germans further along and their reinforcements moved south to oppose the advance to Inverness Copse.

Many German pillboxes in the Kampffeld about 800 yd (730 m) deep were undamaged, especially those at the south-west and north-west angles of Inverness Copse. The troops of Reserve Infantry Regiment 239 were too demoralised by the conditions to offer much resistance and were easily overrun. The ground was full of flooded shell holes but the 7th Queen's advanced to the east side of Inverness Copse and was vulnerable to attack from the south, because the failure to advance of right hand company after being caught on its jumping-off line by artillery and machine-gun fire.

A section of infantry from the company to form the defensive flank along the southern edge, that did reach the strongpoint at the south-west corner, lost all but one man. Two platoons advanced along the north edge of the copse behind the creeping barrage and made it to the objective. After realising that they were isolated and in danger of being outflanked on the left, the platoons retired, captured a pillbox on the way and then setting up a post in Jasper Lane, where they were reinforced by two Vickers guns and the rest of the Queen's on the left, retreated close to the original front line. During the day, the Germans retook the western edge and the blockhouse at the north-western corner; later British attempts to recapture the copse failed.

==== 54th Brigade ====
On the right of the Brigade, the 11th Battalion Royal Fusiliers, attacked on a 375 yd (343 m) front and were met by massed machine-gun fire. Some troops got into the southern edge of Glencorse Wood and on the right flank and a company of the 6th Battalion Northamptonshire Regiment attached as a mopping up party, advanced to fast that it took 40 prisoners from the pillboxes along the southern edge of the wood. On the right, some fusiliers reached Fitzclarence Farm and small engagements took place around the Albrechtstellung pillboxes, which resembled islands surrounded by a sea of mud; both sides captured and re-captured the fortresses in costly attacks and counter-attacks. The fusiliers could not gain touch with the 7th Queen's to the south and a 300 yd (270 m) gap separated the parties around Fitzclarence Farm from Glencorse Wood. German troops bombed along Jargon Trench and other trenches between Inverness Copse and the wood as a counter-attack began from the Copse. Enfilade fire from the south caused many casualties and the counter-attack nearly got behind the fusilier support company, forcing the British out from the most advanced posts, to a line about 200 yd (180 m) east of Clapham Junction. The 11th Fusiliers had suffered so many casualties that an officer collected batmen, runners and pioneers to help with the defence, Lewis guns were used to cover a gap on the right and a company from the Middlesex Regiment took over the line north of the Menin road.

The 7th Bedford had to cross a waste full of derelict and sunken tanks in front of Glencorse Wood, capture ten pillboxes at the south-west corner and fight their way through the wood to a sunken road parallel to the edge of Nonne Bosschen. The Bedford assembled close to the Menin road, also on a 375 yd (343 m) front and advanced unseen through unmanned German night observation outposts. The first wave was held up momentarily by uncut wire at the German front trench but some troops pressed on through gaps as the others fired into the trench. Glencorse Wood was full of smashed trees, with pillboxes on the highest part and other places, which the British fought through with grenades and bayonets, until they reached the British barrage, now standing just beyond the objective. The Bedford were isolated, because the right-hand battalion of the 25th Division to the north had been stopped short of its objective and to the south, the 11th Royal Fusiliers had lost many casualties and not gained touch. The other two battalions of the brigade had been exhausted by holding the front line for the last ten days and at 7:40 a.m., Lee refused a request for the 53rd Brigade to be moved closer, to avoid crowding the area under bombardment and to keep the brigade available to take over after dark. (Note: The brigade moved forward at 3:20 p.m. and the first two battalions only closed up to Sanctuary Wood around 7:00 p.m.)

The ground was too boggy to dig a continuous trench but the 7th Bedford troops were able to defend their positions in the wood for about four hours. By 9:17 a.m., the two companies on the right flank had been forced back and by noon all of the battalion had retreated to Jargon Trench on the western fringe of the wood, half-way back to the start line, with three posts on the left in touch with the 25th Division. German infantry moved into Polygon Wood and Nonne Bosschen from 5:00 p.m. and around 7:00 p.m., a hurricane bombardment fell on Glencorse Wood. Reserve Infantry Regiment 238 and Reserve Infantry Regiment 6, the Stoß regiment of the Eingreif 9th Reserve Division from Reutel, advanced behind a smokescreen into the wood and made a flanking attack from Inverness Copse. The 54th Brigade was forced back to their start line on the right but managed to hold the north-west corner of the wood. Troops from the 53rd Brigade moved forward after dark, struggling up the slope of Stirling Castle Ridge, through a rainstorm and a German bombardment. Guides got lost and the relief of the remnants of the 11th Fusiliers took until 4:15 a.m. on 11 August. A German attack captured a strongpoint and the relieving troops recaptured it at 6:00 a.m.

=== 25th Division ===
The four battalions of the 74th Brigade advanced on a 2,000 yd (1,800 m) front at 4:35 a.m. and were quick enough to evade the German counter-barrage. The outposts of Reserve Infantry Regiment 90, 54th Division, in the front line since 3/4 August, were overrun by 5:30 a.m., several pillboxes being captured. On the right flank, a blockhouse garrison held out for some time, until attacked under cover of a Stokes mortar bombardment. The garrison in Westhoek and two blockhouses in the village were taken by surprise and a deep slough of mud, up to 30 yd (27 m) wide, under 1 ft (0.30 m) of water in the Hanebeek Valley, protected the British from counter-attacks. Further north the centre-left battalion attacked in three waves. A pillbox caused a short delay before being surrounded and the battalion lost many casualties to sniper fire from the right flank. German aircraft swooped low and strafed troops caught moving in the open. The left flank battalion captured its objectives along with several machine-guns and many prisoners. German artillery-fire continued all day but contact with the rear was maintained; the five field artillery brigades responded quickly to calls for covering fire, dispersing German troops assembling for counter-attacks. As German troops reoccupied Glencorse Wood beyond the right flank, German snipers and machine-gunners were able to obstruct consolidation, particularly on the right and it was impossible to dig a continuous front line trench or communication trenches to the rear.

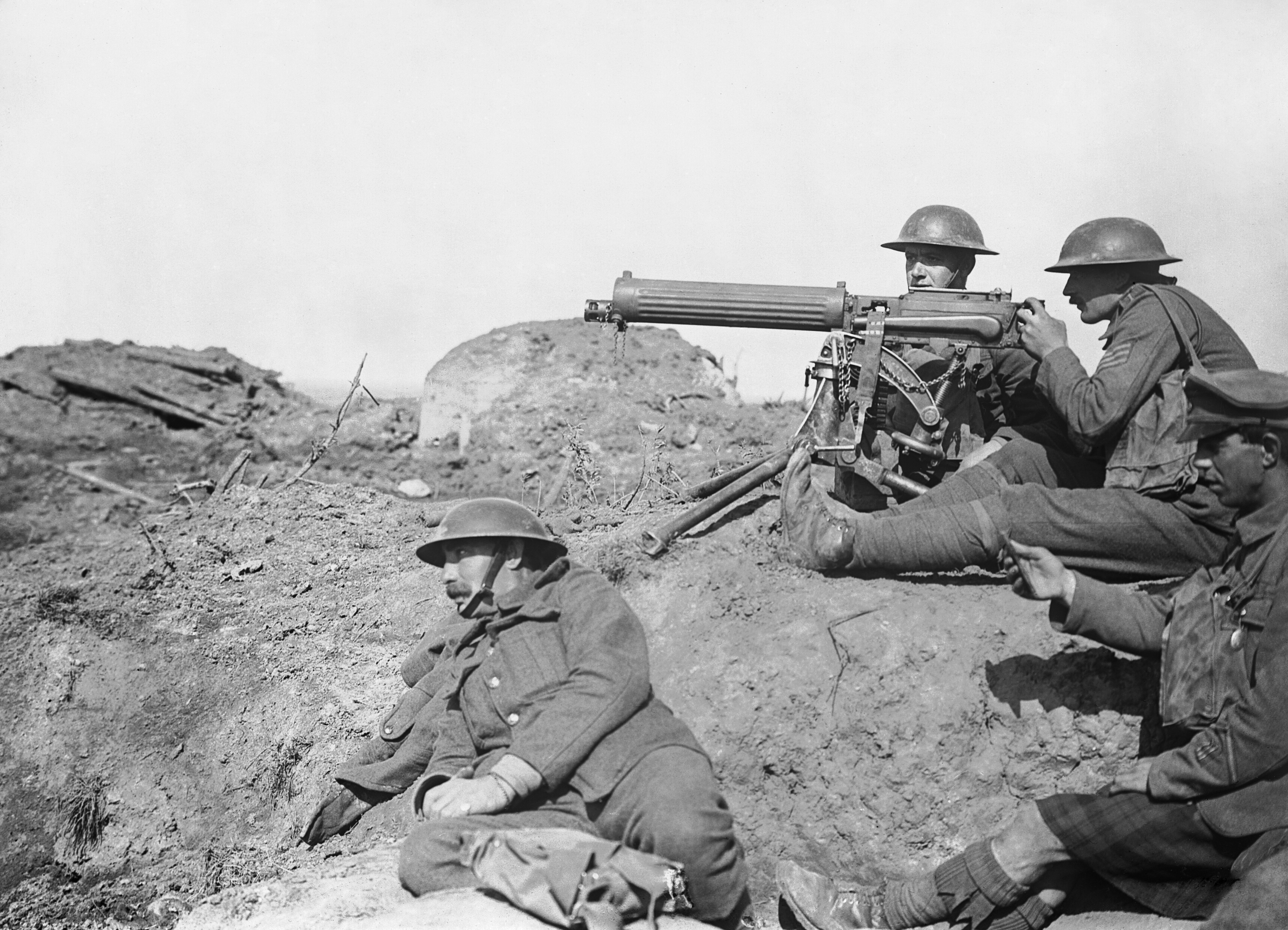
Vickers machine gun in the Battle of Passchendaele – September 1917

The 7th Brigade was in reserve with three of its battalions in support of the 74th Brigade. A battalion was sent forward to reinforce the right flank and another closed up to Westhoek Ridge in immediate reserve; the third battalion was not committed but lost many casualties to German shelling. The Germans attempted to make several counter-attacks into the night but all but one was dispersed by artillery-fire. When a SOS rocket went unseen in the smoke and dusk at 7:15 p.m., a German counter-attack on the left flank was defeated by infantry small-arms fire, rifles being found to be particularly effective. Two Vickers machine-guns brought up close to the front line, fired 10,000 rounds during the day, enfilading German counter-attacks and breaking up troop concentrations. The 75th Brigade took over on the night of 11/12 August and by 14 August, the 56th (1/1st London) Division (Major-General Frederick Dudgeon) and the 8th Division had relieved the 25th Division.

=== Gruppe Wijtschate ===
The 54th Division had a regiment north of the Ypres–Roulers railway and Reserve Infantry Regiment 90 from the railway southwards to Nonne Bosschen, with RIR 27 in support. The 52nd Reserve Division held the line from Nonne Bosschen south to Tower Hamlets, at the head of the Bassevillebeek Spur, with Reserve Infantry Regiment 238, RIR 239 and RIR 240. The infantry of the 52nd Reserve Division had been in the line since 31 July and had become demoralised by the continuous British shelling. At 4:30 a.m. another British bombardment began and SOS flares were fired at 4:45 a.m. The German artillery responded so accurately that the British advance from the Ypres–Roulers railway south to Villa Hanebeek was held up and machine-gunners north of the line fired at the British as they retreated. (Note: German time was an hour ahead of the British time used here.) To the south, on the right flank of RIR 90, the 5th and 6th companies were exhausted and had suffered many casualties; in the morning mist, thickened by smoke shells, the British achieved tactical surprise. The 5th, 6th and 8th companies were broken through and could not prevent the British from rolling up the II Battalion, which suffered many losses after being surrounded. All the telephone wires had been cut in the bombardment and signal lamps could not be seen in the fog and smoke. Observers and machine-gunners further back could not see either and the British captured the Albrechtstellung. When runners reached the 12th Company in the Wilhemstellung, it began an immediate counter-attack and the HQ of RIR 90 signalled for Reserve Infantry Regiment 27 to move forward. The 12th Company managed to cross to the west side of the Hanebeek, despite the British artillery but could advance no further and took cover in several damaged pillboxes.

A better-organised counter-attack with troops of the 10th and 11th companies, with four machine-guns attached from RIR 27, took place later in the morning after the fog had burned off; in the sunshine the German infantry struggled through the mud, sometimes needing to be pulled out. As the Germans tried to negotiate the swampy banks of the Hanebeek, they were hit by British machine-gun fire from the positions on higher ground to the left, captured from the 52nd Reserve Division. Every attempt to get across the stream failed and later the British artillery bombarded the Hanebeek valley. Divisional reserves had begun to move forward when the British attacked and the German artillery continuously bombarded the captured positions in the Albrechtstellung but the British guns stopped every counter-attack in the valley. At 5:30 p.m. after much longer preparatory fire and a short hurricane bombardment, the counter-attack began again, reinforced by troops from RIR 238 on the right flank of the 52nd Reserve Division; the attack was a costly failure. The muddy ground, lack of cover and the excellent view of the ground gained by the British from their captured positions, made it impossible for the Germans to recapture Westhoek Ridge. A few parties made it across the Hanebeek and a group from the 4th Company, RIR 90, managed to overrun a position in Nonne Bosschen wood. A counter-attack at 8:40 p.m. was another costly failure and the remains of RIR 90 spent the night patrolling to prevent a surprise attack.

== Aftermath ==
=== Analysis ===
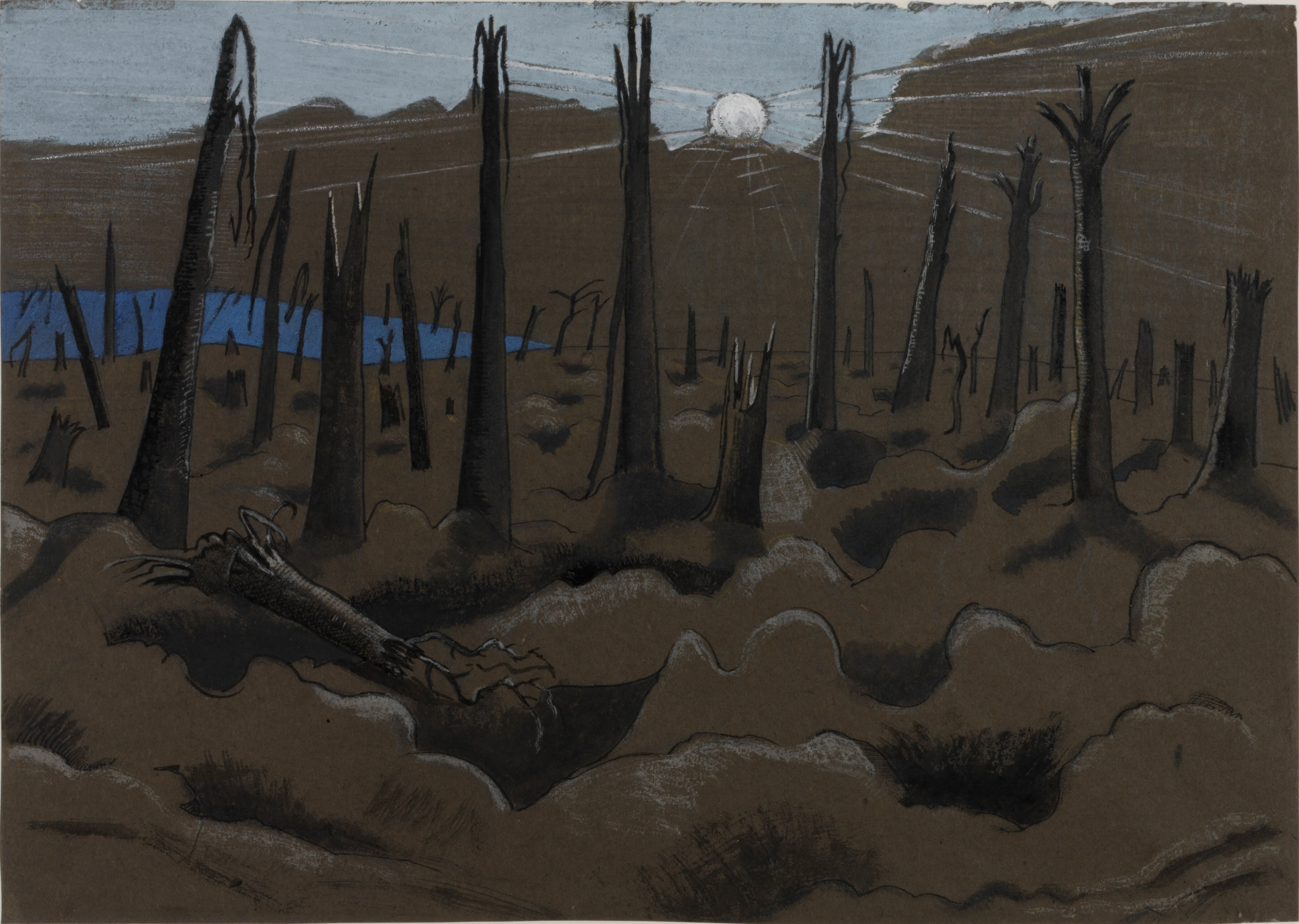
Sunrise, Inverness Copse (Paul Nash, 1917)

The Fifth Army needed to maintain a brisk tempo of attack, to deprive the Germans of time to recover and to create the conditions for Operation Hush on the coast. Hush had to begin during the high tides at the end of August or to be postponed for a month. The Fifth Army had captured ground on the Gheluvelt Plateau on 31 July but the unusually wet and murky weather, the tenacious German defence and determined counter-attacks, left the 4th Army in control of the higher ground around the most vital objectives around Inverness Copse and Glencorse Wood.

In 1920, Malcolm Kincaid-Smith, the divisional historian, called the attack by the 25th Division a great success, the advance being conducted on schedule, supported by "excellent" artillery-fire. Pack-transport was used promptly to deliver ammunition, supplies and engineer stores; carrying-parties from the support battalions kept the front line supplied. The signal arrangements using daylight lamps worked all day, except on the left flank; runners maintained contact with the rear despite the German artillery and small-arms fire. Medical services had been changed after the Battle of Messines in June and worked well. In 1922, G. H. F. Nichols, the historian of the 18th (Eastern) Division, wrote that it had experienced the new German defensive system for the first time in "appalling conditions" and that there had been a "blend of blunders". On 15 August, Rupprecht wrote that General Erich Ludendorff had visited the army group and said that with the French preparing an attack at Verdun, an offensive on the eastern front could only go ahead if Army Group Crown Prince Rupprecht defended the Ypres Salient without reinforcement. Rupprecht considered this to be risky because of a lack of replacements, the 4th Army having suffered 87,528 casualties since 1 June.

In 1931, Hubert Gough wrote that II Corps had gained valuable ground, which gave a view of German lines and removed the last German positions overlooking Ypres. The British were counter-attacked five times during the afternoon and the last attack pushed the 18th (Eastern) Division out of Glencorse Wood. In 1956, Wolfgang Foerster, the author of this volume of German official history, described the miserable living conditions of the troops in early August, the rise in the number of sickness cases and the casualties caused by the British artillery. The British tried to make piecemeal advances, covered by massed artillery-fire and on 10 August managed to advance up to 0.62 mi (1 km) at the junction between Gruppe Wijtschate and Gruppe Ypern. Prior and Wilson, writing in 1996, noted that the days of fine weather preceded the attack but the deluge on 8 August flooded the ground again. The British artillery had failed to subdue the German guns in the unusually rainy weather and the British had been severely bombarded before the attack. The German infantry could do little to resist, having spent too long in the front line and become demoralised. The British made good progress but German counter-attacks and machine-gun fire from Inverness Copse forced back the British until the "mere" 450 yd (410 m) advance of the 25th Division was all that remained. The attack was a costly failure and did not even reach the second objective of 31 July; the only good feature of the attack had been to make it on the Gheluvelt Plateau.

In 2007, Jack Sheldon wrote that on 10 August, the battlefield was still a bog and the British preliminary bombardment failed to destroy all of the pillboxes and blockhouses west and south-west of Polygon Wood. The Germans forced the British back close to their start lines with the support of the German artillery on the rear slopes of the plateau, directed by observers with a good view of the battlefield; Sheldon called the attack a complete failure. J. P. Harris wrote in 2008 that although fresh divisions had been used and a strictly limited objective had been selected, the ground was too wet and lack of observation made British counter-battery fire ineffective. The British had suffered about 2,200 casualties for only a small advance. In 2014, Robert Perry wrote that the result of the attack on 10 August forced Gough to choose between pressing on or pausing the offensive to concentrate troops, who were not easily available. Delaying the Fifth Army attacks to gain artillery superiority was possible but the attempt begun in mid-July had failed. Since 31 July, it had become clear that the 4th Army could replace rapidly its damaged guns and it was not clear that the Fifth Army had the artillery necessary to defeat the firepower of Gruppe Wijtschate. Waiting to attack might improve the readiness of the infantry but could benefit the Germans more by degenerating into an endless artillery duel. Gough chose to continue, after a 24-hour pause for tired troops to be relieved, with a general attack on 15 August but the weather forced another 24-hour postponement; 18.1 mm (0.71 in) of rain fell on 14 August and 8 mm (0.31 in) fell the next day, turning the battlefield back into a swamp. The attack on 16 August began what was possibly the worst period of the war endured by the BEF.

=== Casualties ===
The 25th Division suffered 1,291 casualties, including 158 men killed, 1,033 wounded and 100 troops missing. The 13th Battalion Cheshire Regiment on the right flank suffered 414 of the losses. The 74th Brigade suffered casualties from 5 to 11 August of 1,318 men from a front line strength of 2,493. From 31 July to 10 August, the 18th (Eastern) Division suffered casualties of 244 men killed, 1,106 troops wounded and 176 missing; 59 prisoners were taken. The cost to the Germans of the defence of the Gheluvelt Plateau was such that on 16 August, Brigadier-General Clifford Coffin of the 25th Division reported that the German dead he saw in the Hanebeek Valley lay more thickly than on any previous battlefield. On 15 August, Rupprecht wrote that the defence of the Ypres Salient by the 4th Army was costly, particularly in the wet and cold weather, which was causing much sickness in the infantry. German casualties were counted in ten-day periods and for 1 to 10 August the total for the 4th Army was 16,000, some of which were suffered on the Gheluvelt Plateau on 10 August.

=== Subsequent operations ===
At 11:55 p.m. on 10 August, Jacob ordered the front line to be consolidated and for the 53rd Brigade in the 18th (Eastern) Division area to recapture Glencorse Wood as soon as possible. Because of the weather, the condition of the ground and one of the relieving battalions deviating north of the Menin road instead of east, the attack was postponed for 24 hours. The artillery could not be warned in time and opened fire but the infantry advance was cancelled in time and the attack was later called off. II Corps attacked the plateau again on 16 August, during the general attack during the Battle of Langemarck and in a local operation against Inverness Copse on 22 August. The Germans conducted a methodical counter-attack (Gegenangriff) on 24 August and recaptured the Copse, amidst much confusion on both sides. Haig cancelled a general attack intended for 25 August and altered the Fifth Army–Second Army boundary for the third time. A tank-infantry attack on Inverness Copse on 27 August failed when the tanks bogged down on the Menin road and another attack was cancelled on 31 August because of rain. The Second Army took over the II Corps front on the Gheluvelt Plateau in early September and Plumer was allowed three weeks to prepare the next attack. From 25 June to 31 August, the II Corps artillery had fired 2,766,824 shells, amounting to 85,396 long tons (86,766 t).
