= Jean Smellie =

British paediatrician (1927–2020)

Dr Jean Smellie DM FRCP HonFRCPCH
- Born: 14 May 1927; Liverpool
- Died: 14 September 2020 (aged 93); Winchester
- Education: St Hugh's College, Oxford
- Occupation: Paediatrician

Dr Jean McIldowie Smellie DM FRCP HonFRCPCH (14 May 1927 – 14 September 2020) was a British paediatrician.

Smellie studied medicine at St Hugh's College, Oxford, and then at University College Hospital.

From 1952 to 1961, she underwent specialised training in paediatrics at Royal Manchester Children's Hospital, Great Ormond Street Hospital, University College Hospital and in Oxford.

She held the position of Honorary Consultant Paediatrician and Senior Lecturer, at University College Hospital from 1970 to 1993, becoming Emeritus on retirement. She was also Honorary Consultant Paediatric Nephrologist at Guy's Hospital and at Great Ormond Street; and from 1984 to 1992 was Honorary Senior Lecturer in Community Child Health, at Southampton University.

She was elected an Honorary Fellow of the Royal College of Paediatrics and Child Health.

Correspondence relating to one of her cases is in the special collections of University College London.

== Personal life ==
Smellie was married to Professor Colin Normand (1928–2011) and was known as Jean Normand in private life, but she used her maiden name for professional purposes.
