= Guy's Hospital =

Hospital in central London

- Guy's and St Thomas' NHS Foundation Trust
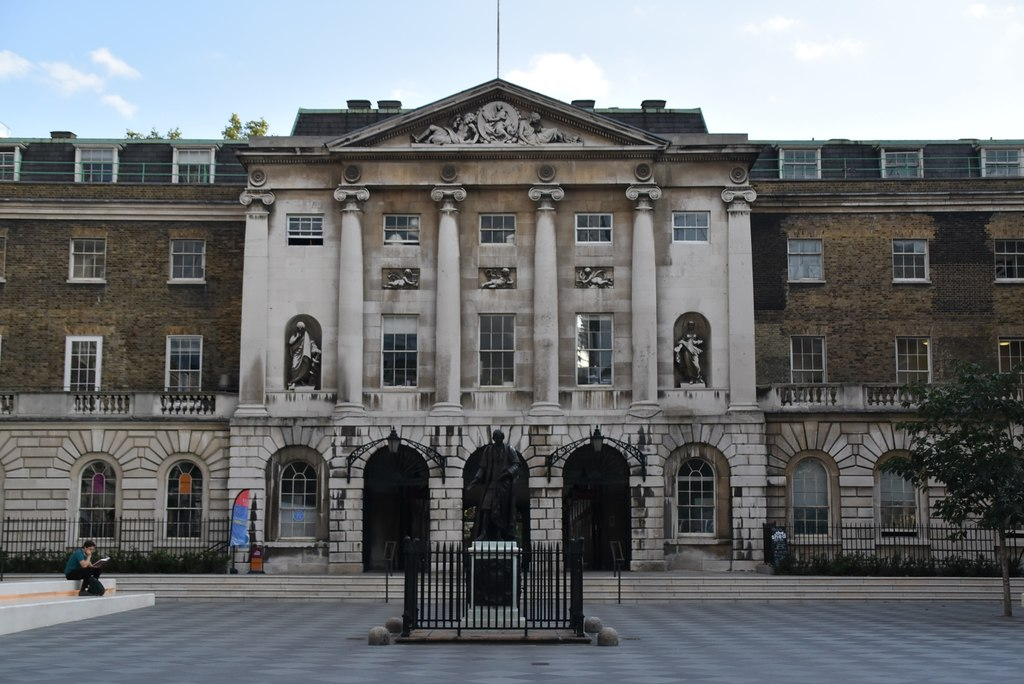
- Guy's Hospital entrance

- Shown in Southwark

Geography
- Location: Great Maze Pond, Southwark SE1 9RT, London, England
- Coordinates: 51°30′12″N 0°5′13″W

Organisation
- Care system: NHS England
- Type: Teaching
- Affiliated university: King's College London GKT School of Medical Education

Services
- Emergency department: N/A
- Beds: 400

History
- Founded: 1721; 305 years ago

Links
- Website: www.guysandstthomas.nhs.uk

Guy's Hospital is an NHS hospital founded by philanthropist Thomas Guy in 1721, located in the borough of Southwark in central London. It is part of Guy's and St Thomas' NHS Foundation Trust and one of the institutions that comprise the King's Health Partners, an academic health science centre. It is the large teaching hospital of GKT School of Medical Education.

The hospital's Tower Wing (originally known as Guy's Tower) was, when built in 1974, the tallest hospital building in the world, standing at 148.65 metres (487.7 ft) with 34 floors. The tower was overtaken as the world's tallest healthcare-related building by The Belaire in New York City in 1988. As of June 2019, the Tower Wing, which remains one of the tallest buildings in London, is the world's sixth-tallest hospital building.

== History ==
The hospital dates from 1721, when it was founded by philanthropist Thomas Guy, who had made a fortune as a printer of Bibles and greatly increased it by speculating in the South Sea Bubble. It was originally established as a hospital to treat "incurables" discharged from St Thomas' Hospital. Guy had been a governor and benefactor of St Thomas' and his fellow governors supported his intention by granting the south-side of St Thomas Street for a peppercorn rent for 999 years. Following his death in 1724, Thomas Guy was entombed at the hospital's chapel (also dating from the 18th century), in a tomb featuring a marble sculpture by John Bacon.

The original buildings formed a courtyard facing St Thomas Street, comprising the hall on the east side and the chapel, Matron's House and Surgeon's House on the west side. The original main buildings were built by the King's Master Mason, John Deval, in 1739.

A bequest of £180,000 by William Hunt in 1829, one of the largest charitable bequests in England in historic terms, allowed for a further hundred beds to be accommodated. Hunt's name was given to the southern expansion of the hospital buildings which took place in 1850. Two inner quadrangles were divided by a cloister which was later restyled and dedicated to the hospital's members who fell in the First World War. The east side comprised the care wards and the "counting house" with the governors' Burfoot Court Room. The north-side quadrangle is dominated by a statue of Lord Nuffield (1877–1963) who was the chairman of governors for many years and also a major benefactor.

In 1879-1880 the "Guy's Hospital dispute" between matron Margaret Burt and hospital medical staff highlighted how doctors sometimes felt that their authority was being challenged by new-style matrons. Florence Nightingale advocated that these new trained matrons had full control and discipline over their nursing staff. Margaret Burt ultimately resigned, but this was not an isolated episode and other matrons experienced similar issues, such as Eva Luckes.

In 1974, the hospital added the 34-storey Guy's Tower and 29-storey Guy's House: this complex was designed by Watkins Gray. The Wolfson Centre for Age-Related Diseases, which is dedicated to improving outcomes of conditions such as Alzheimer's disease, stroke, Parkinson's disease and spinal cord injury, was opened by the Princess Royal in December 2004.

In October 2005 children's departments moved to the Evelina London Children's Hospital in the grounds next to St Thomas's close to the Palace of Westminster. A new cancer centre, designed by Rogers Stirk Harbour + Partners, and built by Laing O'Rourke at a cost of £160 million, was completed in April 2016.

In 2023, a twin operating theatre was installed by ModuleCo in partnership with Whites Traffic Management.

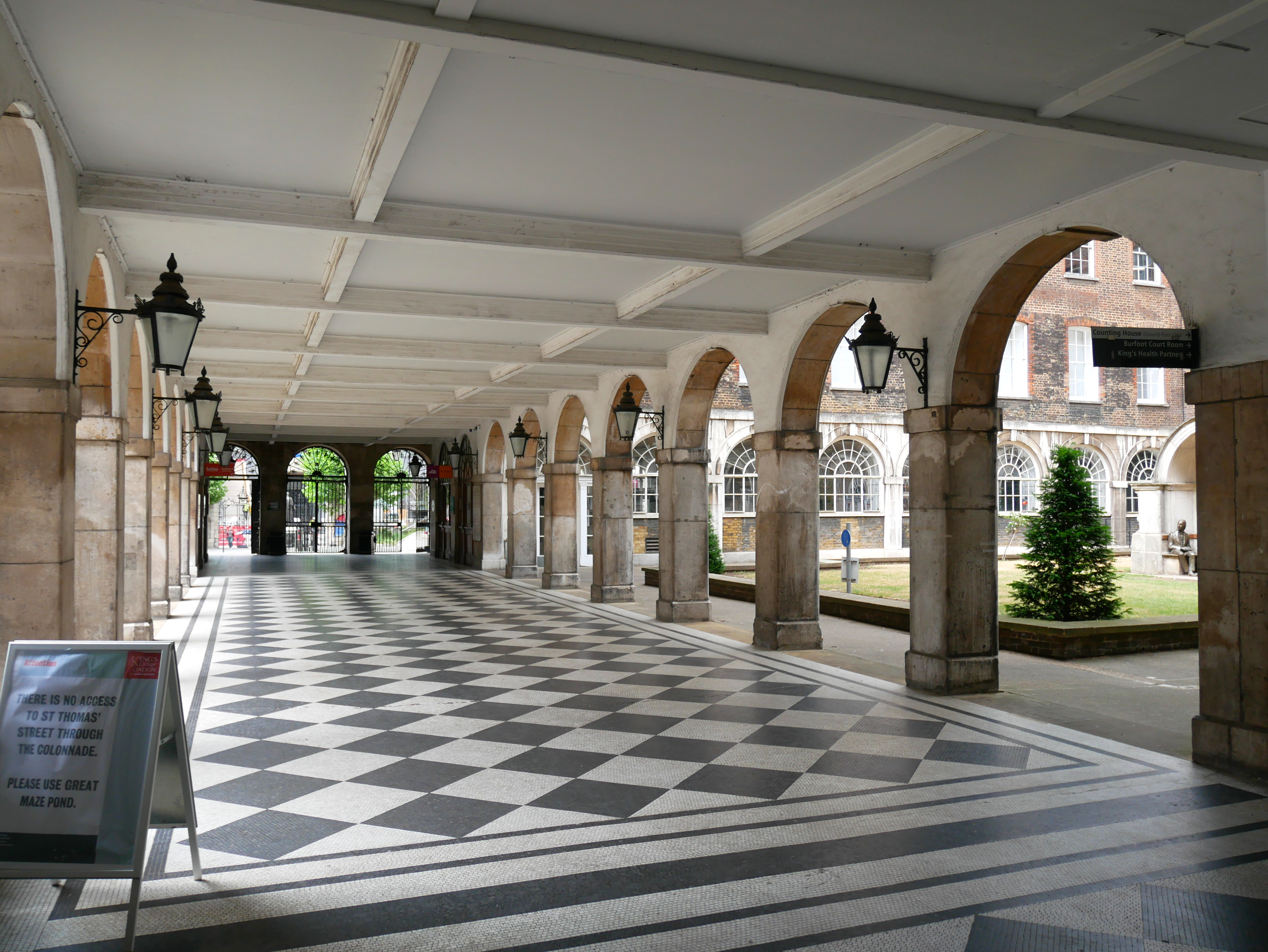
Interior passageway inside Guy's Hospital

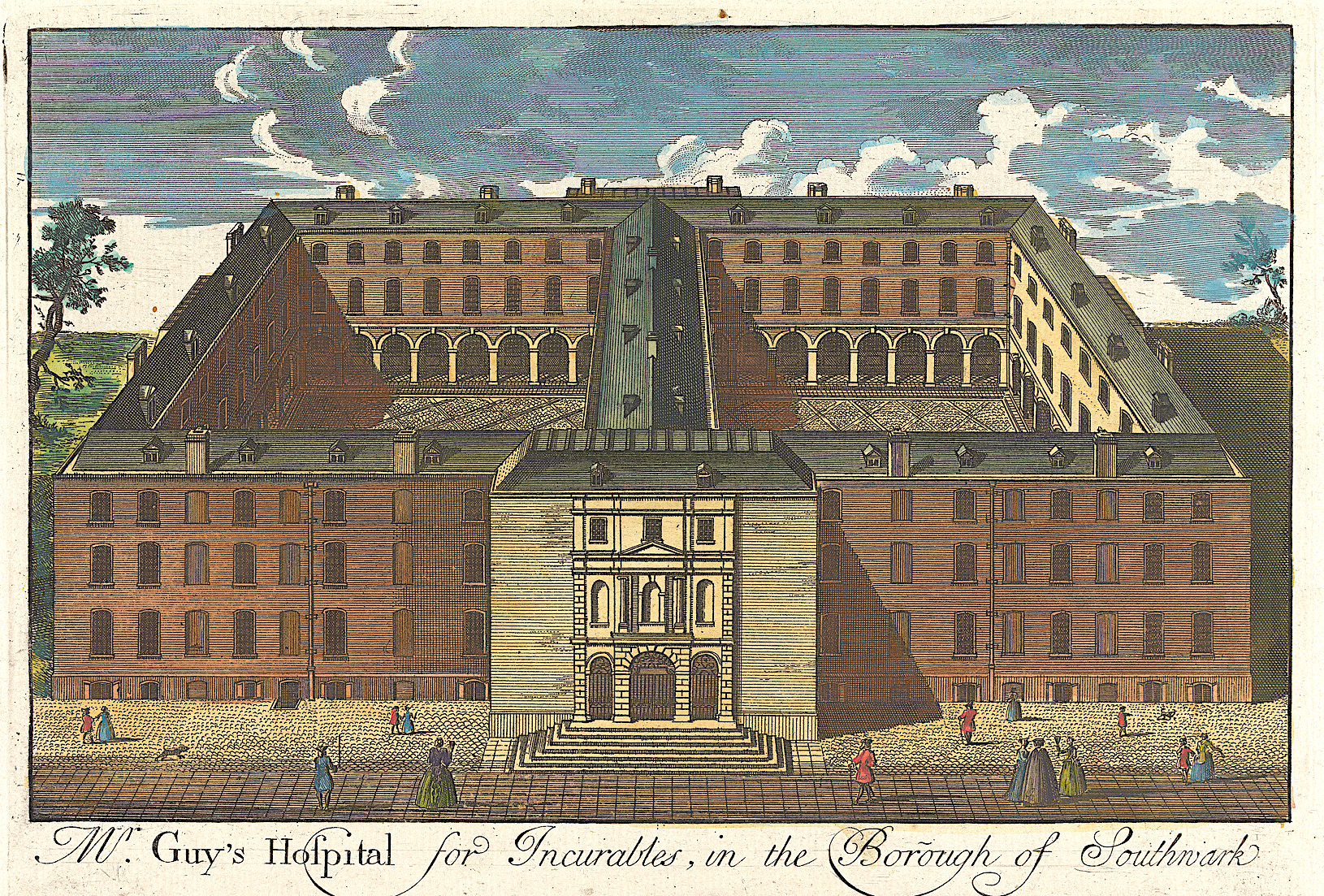
Early 18th century engraving

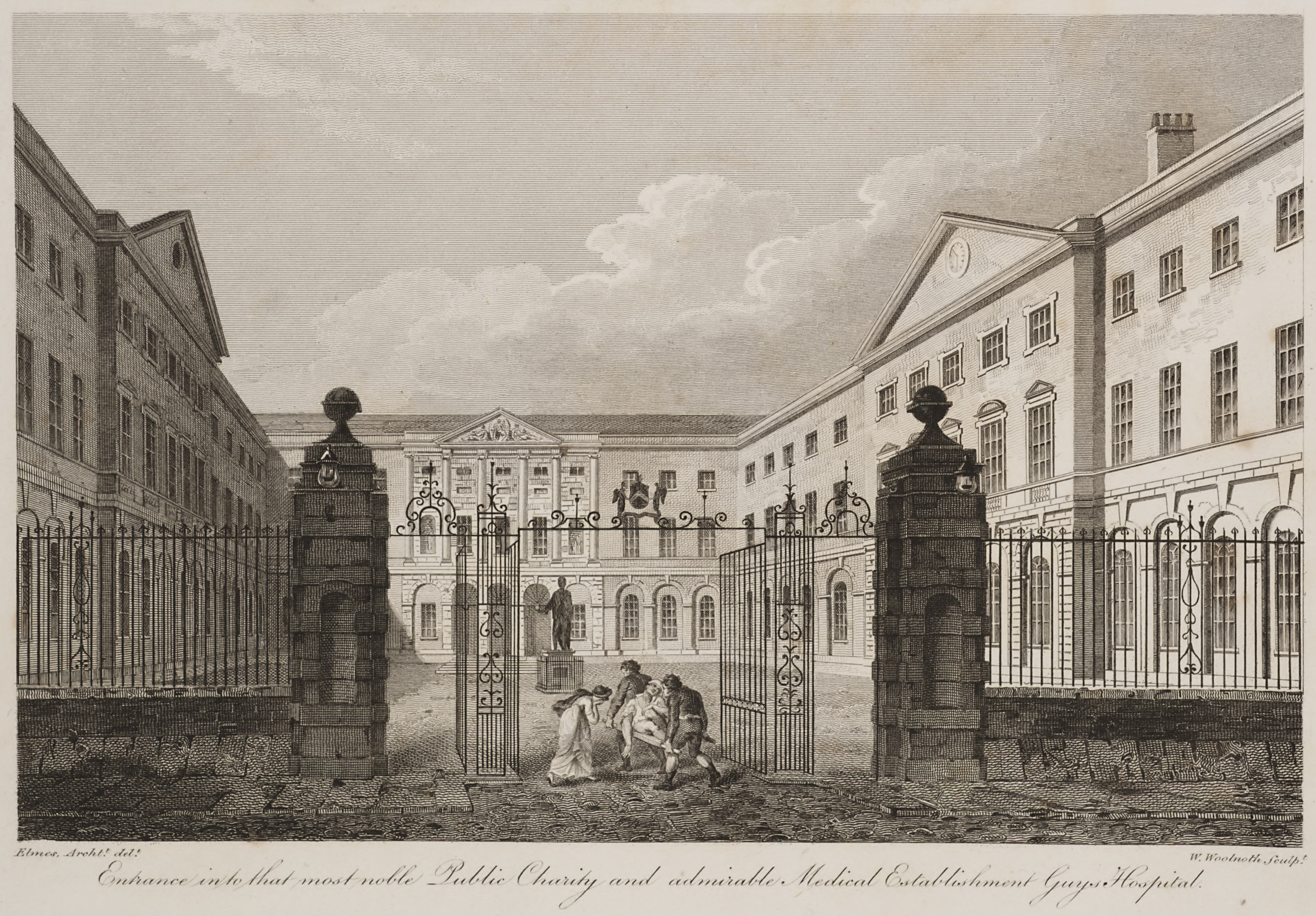
1820 Engraving of entrance by James Elmes and William Woolnoth

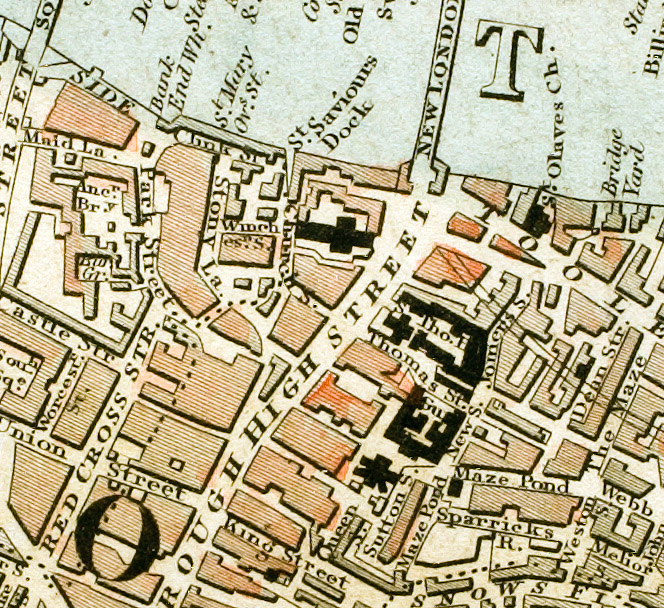
The location of Guy's and St Thomas' hospitals, c. 1833

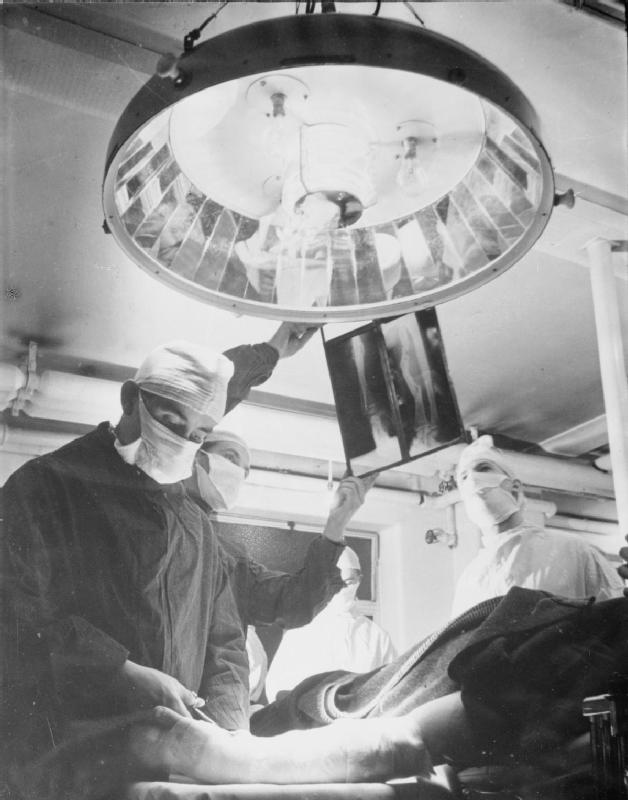
Surgery is performed at Guy's in 1941

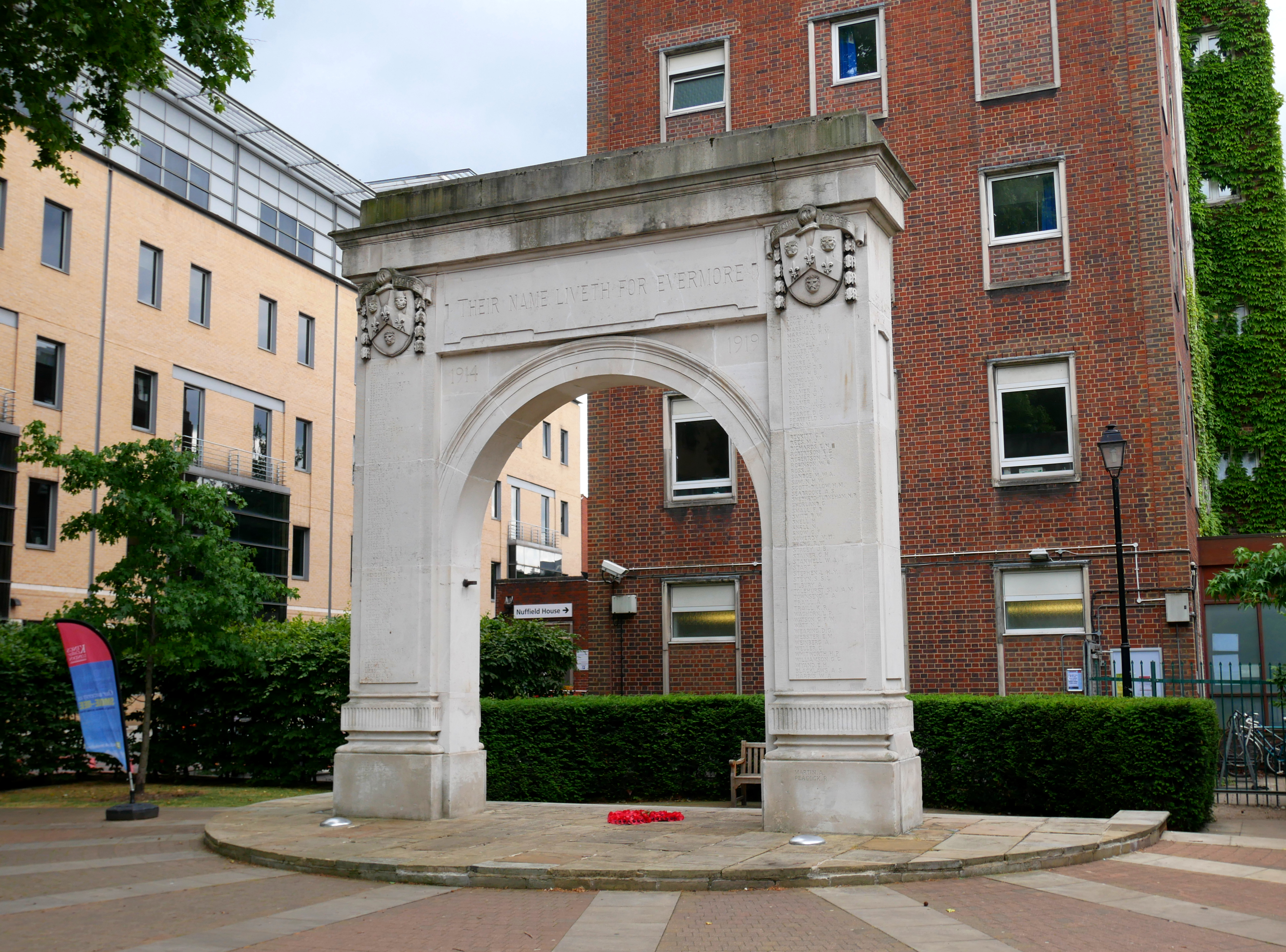
War memorial at Guy's Hospital
General Court of Guy's Hospital

Guy's Hospital Tower (Tower Wing)

== Facilities ==
Tower Wing
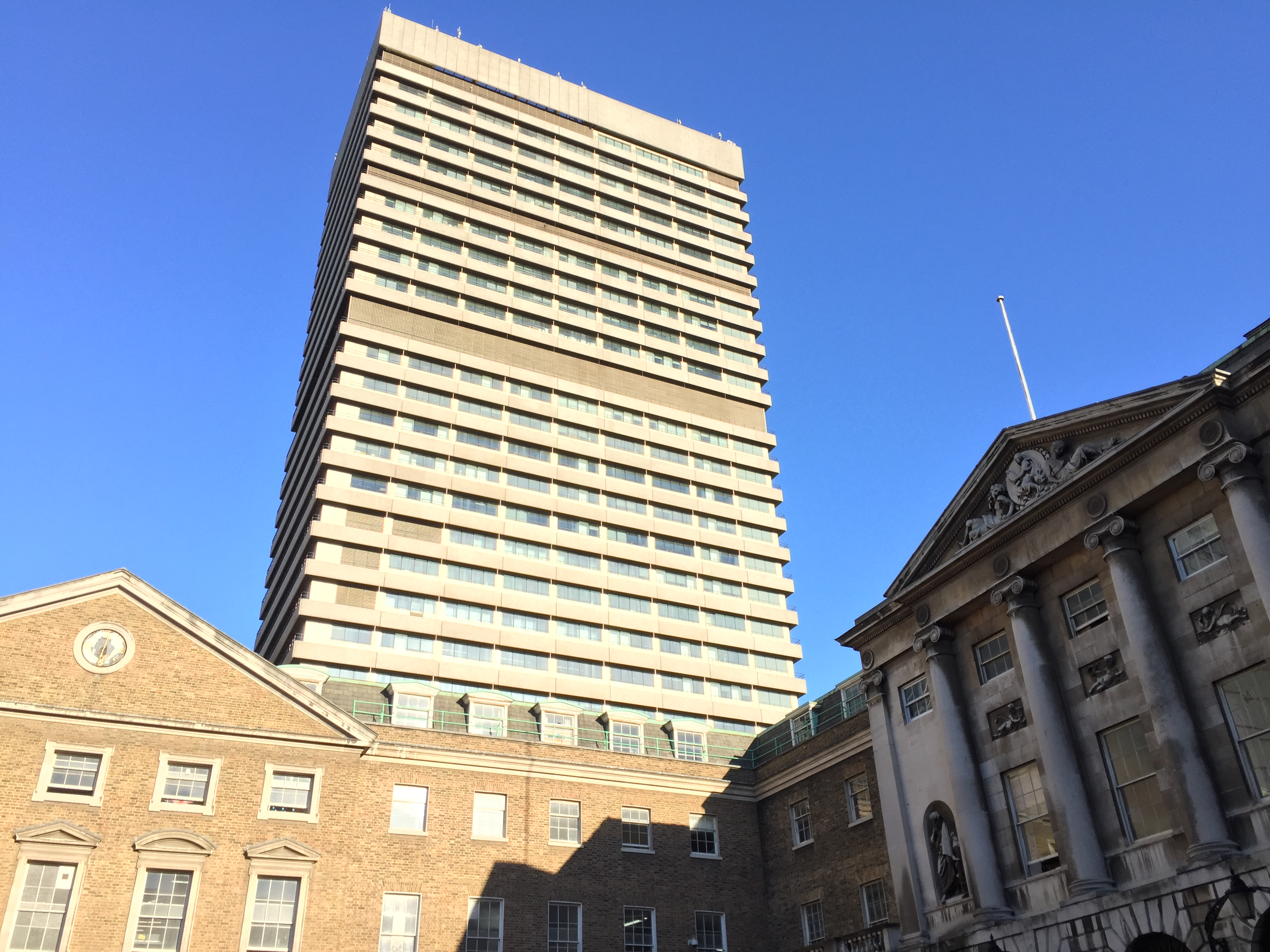
- Tower Wing, after exterior refurbishment
- Interactive map of the Tower Wing area

General information
- Status: Completed
- Location: Southwark
- Coordinates: 51°30′14″N 0°5′13″W
- Current tenants: Guy's and St Thomas' NHS Foundation Trust
- Construction started: 1968
- Completed: 1974
- Owner: National Health Service

Height
- Height: 148.65 metres (487.7 ft)

Design and construction
- Architect: Watkins Gray

Medical services at the Guy's site are now concentrated in the buildings to the east of Great Maze Pond: these buildings, which are connected, are known as Tower Wing, Bermondsey Wing, Southwark Wing and Borough Wing. The Cancer Centre is in a separate building just to the south. To the west of the Great Maze Pond is Guy's Campus which forms part of King's College London.

At 148.65 metres (487.7 ft) high, Guy's Tower (now called the Tower Wing) regained its tallest hospital building in the world status in 2014, due to the installation of a light sculpture on the roof. It has since been surpassed by the Outpatient Center at the Houston Methodist Hospital, in Houston, USA at 156.05 metres (512.0 ft).

== Notable people ==
- Harold Ackroyd, First World War recipient of the Victoria Cross
- Thomas Addison, discoverer of Addison's disease
- Stephanie Amiel, diabetologist
- John Belchier, surgeon
- William Babington, founder member of the Geological Society
- Benjamin Guy Babington invented the laryngoscope
- Richard Bright, discoverer of Bright's disease
- Russell Brock, Baron Brock, pioneer of modern open-heart surgery
- Frank Cook, Surgeon
- John Butterfield, Baron Butterfield Professor of Experimental Medicine
- Trevor Clay nurse and General Secretary of the Royal College of Nursing
- Sydney Cohen, Professor of Chemical Pathology
- Sir Astley Cooper, discoverer of the Cooper's ligaments of the breasts
- Edward Cock, surgeon and nephew of Sir Astley Cooper
- Dame Rachel Crowdy, Principal Commandant of Voluntary Aid Detachments in France and Belgium from 1914 to 1919
- Prokar Dasgupta, Urologist and robotic surgeon
- C. S. Forester, English novelist, studied medicine at Guy's but did not graduate
- John Frederick France, ophthalmic surgeon
- Graham Fraser, consultant and pioneer of cochlear implants in the United Kingdom.
- Sir Alfred Downing Fripp, surgeon who was knighted for his part in the reform of the R.A.M.C.
- Sir William Kelsey Fry, pioneering dental surgeon
- Abraham Pineo Gesner, surgeon and inventor of kerosene refining
- Sir William Withey Gull, the first to describe myxoedema and coined the term anorexia nervosa
- Edward Headlam Greenhow, physician, sanitarian and Guy's and St Thomas' Hospitals lecturer
- Thomas Michael Greenhow, surgeon and sanitarian
- Georgiana Hill, cookery book writer, worked as a ward sister
- Henry Bendelack Hewetson, ophtalmic and Aural surgeon
- John Braxton Hicks, obstetrician, discoverer of the Braxton Hicks uterine contractions
- Mary Ann Hilliard, outpatient sister and later notable suffragette
- John Hilton, anatomist and surgeon
- James Hinton, otologist
- Thomas Hodgkin, discoverer of Hodgkin's lymphoma
- Sir Frederick Hopkins, discoverer of vitamins
- James Jurin, early work on epidemiology of the smallpox vaccine
- John Keats, poet
- Thomas Wilkinson King, anatomical pathologist
- Emily MacManus, Matron
- Alan Menter, International Psoriasis Council, Founder
- Frederick Akbar Mahomed, physician who helped define essential hypertension as a distinct disease
- J. F. O. Mustaffah, first Ghanaian Neurosurgeon
- Humphry Osmond, psychiatrist who worked with psychedelic drugs and coined the term
- Frederick William Pavy, worked with Richard Bright, one of the founders and presidents of the Medical and Chirurgical Society of London
- Sir Edwin Cooper Perry Superintendent; Dean of the Medical School; 1st Warden of the Residential College
- Sir Alfred Poland, the first to describe Poland syndrome
- Philip Henry Pye-Smith, physician
- Patricia Batty Shaw, social worker
- Devi Prasad Shetty, cardiac surgeon and founder of Narayana Hrudayalaya
- Keith Simpson, Home Office Pathologist
- Jean Smellie, paediatrician
- Dame Sarah Swift, matron, founder of the College of Nursing, later the Royal College of Nursing
- Anthony Trafford, Baron Trafford, Conservative MP, was student and later senior registrar
- Gerard Folliott Vaughan, psychiatrist, who became a politician and minister of state during Margaret Thatcher's government
- Iain West, forensic pathologist
- William James West, discoverer of epileptic spasms; West syndrome was named in his honour
- Sir Samuel Wilks
- Ludwig Wittgenstein, worked anonymously as a hospital porter during World War II

== Arms ==
Coat of arms of Guy's Hospital
Notes Granted 24 May 1725 to the Corporation for the Management and Disposition of the Charities of Thomas Guy of London. Crest On a wreath of the colours a woman sitting accompanied with three children Proper habited Azure being the emblem of Charity. Escutcheon Sable on a chevron Or between three leopards' heads Argent each crowned with an Eastern crown of the second as many fleurs-de-lis Azure. Supporters On either side an angel Proper habited Argent the hair and wings Or each holding a book Proper the clasps Gold. Motto Dare Quam Accipere (Give rather than receive)

== See also ==
- Francis Crick Institute
- Healthcare in London
- King's Health Partners
- List of hospitals in England
- Tall buildings in London
