= Edward France =

Edward France was a cabinetmaker and upholsterer in 18th century London and a member of the well known France family who held the Royal Warrant for over half a century. He was the nephew of William France Snr and older brother of William France Jnr, both of whom were cabinetmakers to the Royal Household. He was born in 1748 and died in 1777. He was made a Freeman of Lancaster in 1773–74.

== Early career ==
Edward France was born in 1748 in Lancaster, the son of cabinetmaker John France. (Note: Contrary to the major 'recognised' works on 18th century Cabinetmakers (e.g. The Dictionary of English Furniture Makers 1660 to 1840 et al), Edward was not William Snr's son but his nephew. see reference 3 for Geoffrey Castle.) He worked with his Uncle, William Snr, as an apprentice from 1766 until 1768 and continued working for him until his Uncle died. It is also recorded that Edward France & Co, Upholders of London were paid £12 12s on 3 July 1766 by the Duke of Portland for work done at Burlington House.

== Royal warrant ==
Although the Royal Family favoured awarding the royal warrant to succeeding generations of a tradesman's family, this did not happen after the death of Edward's uncle William in 1773. As John (Edward's father) was not an upholsterer and Edward, at twenty four, too young to take on the appointment of what was one of the largest suppliers of goods to the Royal Household, William Farnborough was appointed in William's stead.

At this time Edward was working out of 101 St Martin's Lane, Charing Cross, London as an Upholsterer and Cabinet Maker when he was admitted as a Freeman of Lancaster, 1773–74, when stated 'of Westminster'. Unfortunately, John France did not survive his brother for long, dying in 1775. His two sons Edward and William succeeded to the business. Even then it is Edward France's name alone that is recorded c 1775, as supplying furniture for the state rooms at Erddig Park, Clwyd.

However Edward's brother William Jnr subsequently went into partnership with Samuel Beckwith, to form 'France & Beckwith', as Edward France had died in 1777.

The name of the firm appears in the Royal Household bills until the end of the century, and their trade card "France and Beckwith Upholsterers and Cabinet makers to His Majesty, no 101 St Martin’s Lane", is dated 1803.
