= 54th Infantry Division (German Empire) =

54th Infantry Division (54. Infanterie-Division)
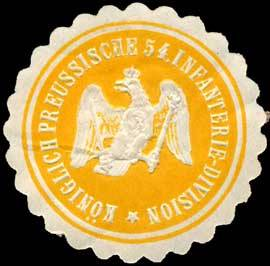
- Active: 3 March 1915 – January 1919
- Country: German Empire
- Branch: Imperial German Army
- Type: Infantry
- Size: Approx. 15,000
- Engagements: World War I: Battle of Verdun; Passchendaele; Battle of Cambrai

The 54th Infantry Division (54.Infanterie-Division) was a division of the Imperial German Army during World War I. The division was formed on March 3, 1915, from units taken from other divisions or newly raised. Its infantry core was from different parts of the German Empire: the 27th Reserve Infantry Regiment from Prussian Saxony, taken from the 7th Reserve Division, the 84th Infantry Regiment from Schleswig-Holstein, taken from the 18th Infantry Division, and the 90th Reserve Infantry Regiment from the Grand Duchy of Mecklenburg-Schwerin, taken from the 18th Reserve Division. Divisional cavalry was a squadron of Brunswick's Death's Head Hussars.

After a brief period on the line in France, the division was sent to the Eastern Front in July 1915. It returned to the Western Front in October 1915. From May to November 1916, the division saw extensive action in the Battle of Verdun, especially in the fight for Fort Douaumont. In 1917, it saw action in the Third Battle of Ypres, suffering heavy losses. It also faced the Allied tank attack in Cambrai in November 1917. It was rated by Allied intelligence in 1917 and 1918 as a second class division, mainly due to heavy losses in the attacks it faced or took part in.

== Order of battle on March 3, 1915 ==
The 54th Infantry Division's initial organization when formed in 1915 was as follows:

- 108.Infanterie-Brigade
  - Reserve-Infanterie-Regiment Nr. 27
  - Infanterie-Regiment von Manstein (1. Schleswigsches) Nr. 84
  - Großherzoglich Mecklenburgisches Reserve-Infanterie-Regiment Nr. 90
  - Radfahrer-Kompanie Nr. 54
- 1.Eskadron/Braunschweigisches Husaren-Regiment Nr. 17
- 54.Feldartillerie-Brigade
  - Feldartillerie-Regiment Nr. 107
  - Feldartillerie-Regiment Nr. 108
  - Fußartillerie-Bataillon Nr. 54
- Pionier-Kompanie Nr. 107
- Pionier-Kompanie Nr. 108

== Late World War I organization ==
The division underwent comparatively fewer organizational changes during the course of the war than most other divisions. Its artillery, signals and engineers were reorganized as in other divisions. The 54th Infantry Division's order of battle on February 22, 1918, was as follows:

- 108.Infanterie-Brigade
  - Reserve-Infanterie-Regiment Nr. 27
  - Infanterie-Regiment von Manstein (1. Schleswigsches) Nr. 84
  - Großherzoglich Mecklenburgisches Reserve-Infanterie-Regiment Nr. 90
  - MG-Scharfschützen-Abteilung Nr. 39
- 1.Eskadron/Braunschweigisches Husaren-Regiment Nr. 17
- Artillerie-Kommandeur 55:
  - Feldartillerie-Regiment Nr. 108
  - Fußartillerie-Bataillon Nr. 54 (from 16.04.1918)
- Stab Pionier-Bataillon Nr. 138:
  - Pionier-Kompanie Nr. 107
  - Pionier-Kompanie Nr. 108
  - Minenwerfer-Kompanie Nr. 54
- Divisions-Nachrichten-Kommandeur 54
