= Jane Ackroyd =

British artist

- Born: 1957 (age 68–69); London
- Education: St Martin's School of Art; Royal College of Art
- Known for: Sculpture

Jane Ackroyd (born 1957) is a British artist best known for her public sculptures. She is based in London.

== Biography ==
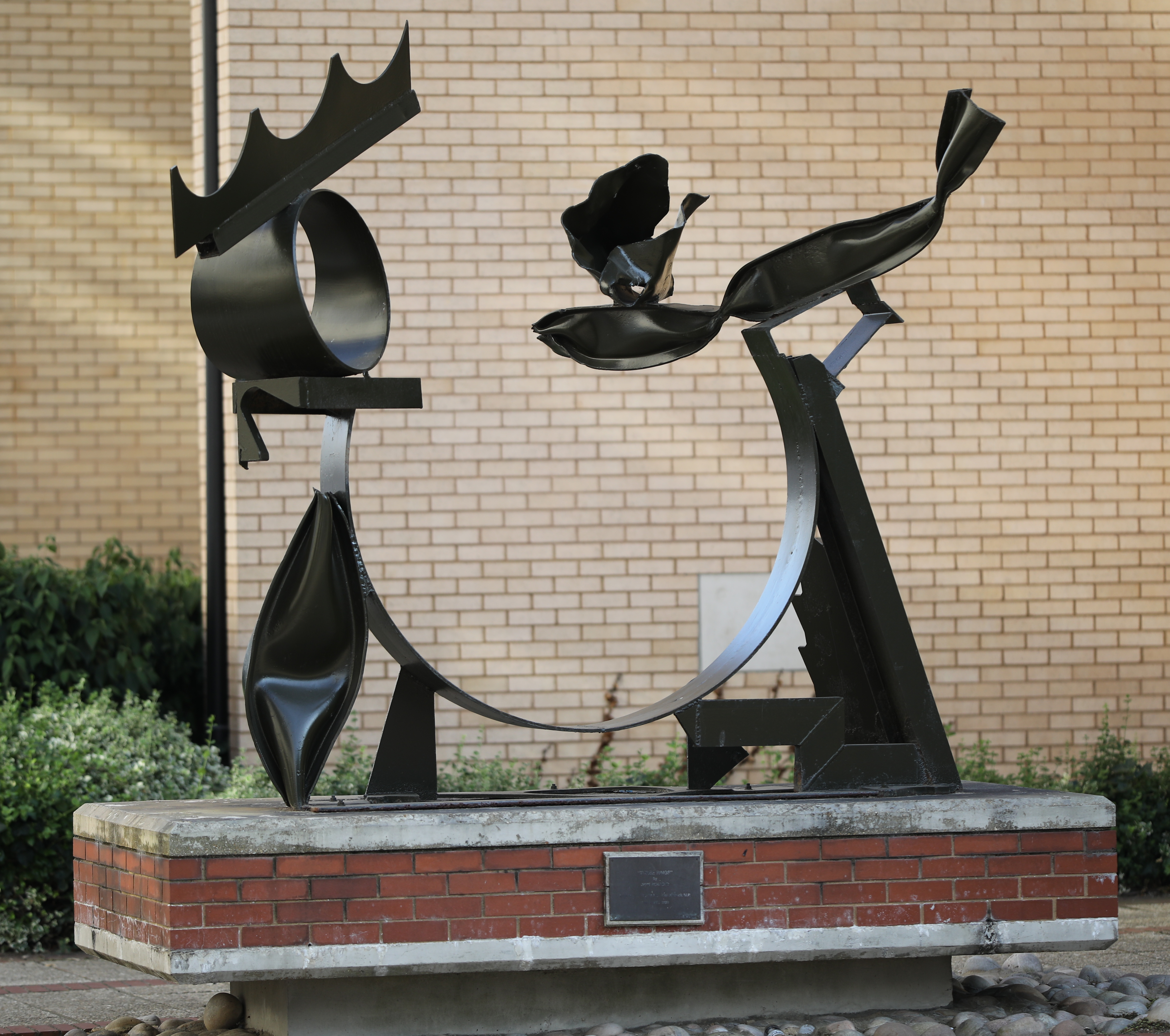
Three Rings (2018), Ocean Village, by Jane Ackroyd

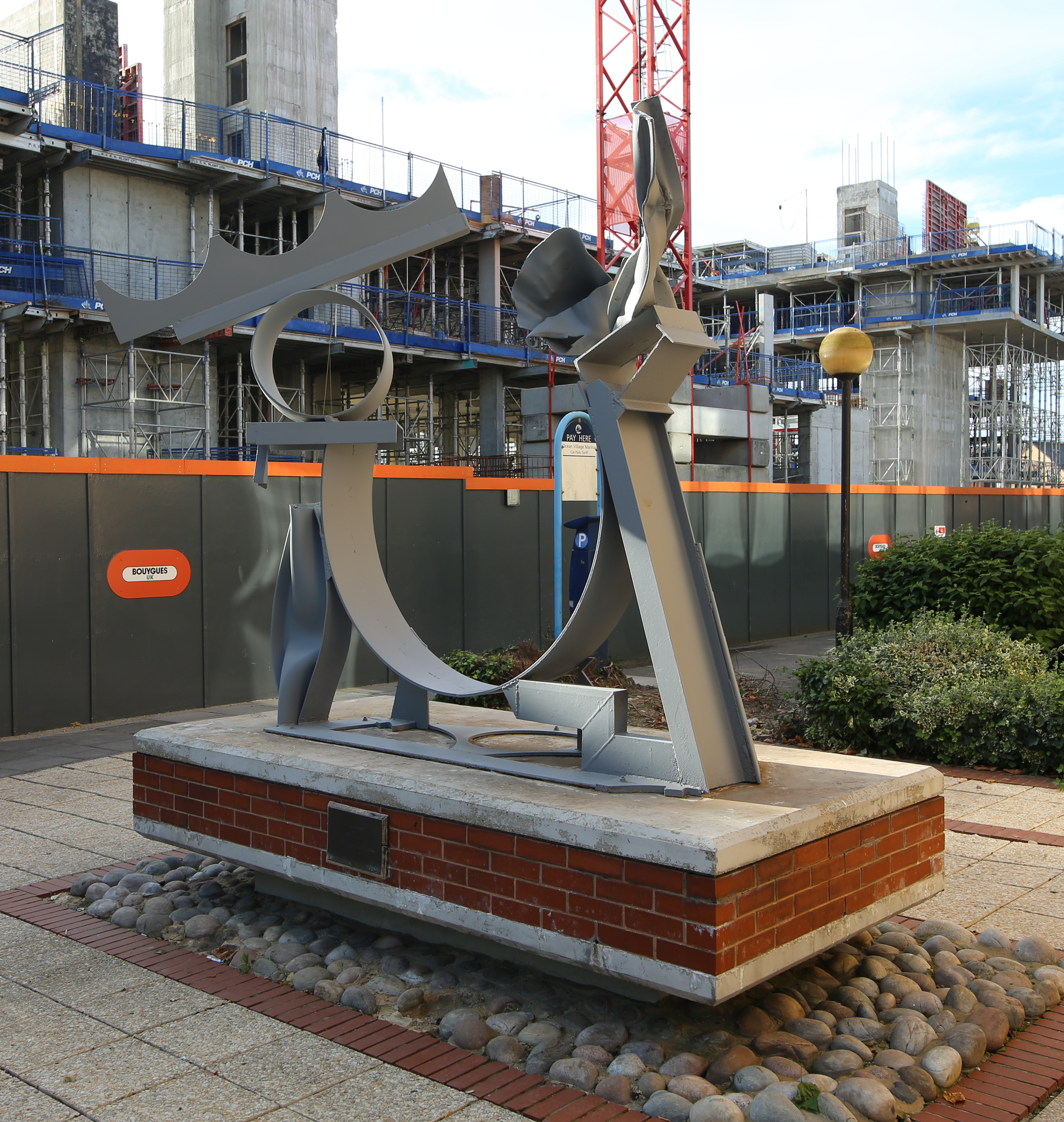
Three Rings (2018), Ocean Village, by Jane Ackroyd

Ackroyd was born in London and attended St Martin's School of Art from 1979 to 1982. She then studied for her master's degree at the Royal College of Art between 1982 and 1983. In 1984 she held an artist-in-residence post in Leicestershire and had her first solo exhibition at the Kingsgate Workshops Gallery. From 1988 she has been a regular exhibitor at the Royal Academy summer exhibitions in London and has had a series of solo exhibitions at the Anderson O'Day gallery. Ackroyd participated in the first Royal West of England Academy Open Sculpture Exhibition held in 1993.

Ackroyd's public commissions often feature birds and animals, for example Cat at the Old Library in Harlow. Other public commissions include Well at the Museum of Harlow, at the site of the former Royal Free Hospital in Islington and the Haymarket in London. The Arts Council England, the Contemporary Arts Society, the Leicestershire Education Authority and the Goodwood Sculpture Park hold works by Ackroyd.

== Awards ==
- In 1983 Ackroyd won the Special Melchett Award for work in steel and a travel scholarship to Carrara in Italy.
- During her time at the Royal College of Art, Ackroyd was awarded the Fulham Pottery Award.
- Ackroyd was awarded the Europa Nostra Award for the 1993 redevelopment of The Old Royal Free Hospital, Islington, in collaboration with Levitt Bernstein Architects.
- In 1995 Ackroyd received the Jackson Pollock-Lee Krasner Foundation Award in New York.

== Works in collections ==
Title	Year	Medium	Gallery no.	Gallery	Location
Cat	1983	welded mild steel	14	Harlow Art Trust	Harlow, England
Chicken	-	metal	0589	Leicestershire County Council Artworks Collection	Leicestershire, England
Dog	-	metal	0922	Leicestershire County Council Artworks Collection	Leicestershire, England
Everything but the Kitchen Sink	2011	copper	S.2011.686.CC	Central Saint Martins	London, England
Queen Victoria	1987	welded steel	3774	West Middlesex University Hospital	London, England
Well Head	-	mild steel	CM20_TJ_S034	Harlow Museum	Harlow, England
