= Joe Akroyd =

English loudspeaker manufacturer

Joe Akroyd is best known for his work at Royd Loudspeakers Co. Ltd. (commonly known as Royd Audio) a small low volume Hi-Fi loudspeakers manufacturer that was based in Telford, Shropshire, England. Royd Audio was founded in 1980 and finally closed in 2004, when Joe Akroyd retired.

== Before Royd Audio ==
Prior to starting Royd Audio, Joe Akroyd worked for Goodmans in the early 1960s, where he contributed to the Maxim mini monitor and the Audiom and Axiom bass drivers. In 1970, Joe Akroyd joined Wharfedale, where he was involved in the manufacture and design of the Denton, Linton, Melton, Triton, Doredale loudspeakers. During the mid-1970s Joe Akroyd joined Decca, in their newly reorganized Speaker department. However, in 1979, Racal bought Decca, at which point Joe Akroyd left to set up Royd Audio.

== Retirement ==
Joe Akroyd closed Royd Audio in 2004 so as to retire. After two protracted a long failed buy out negotiations, the remaining stock and parts was bought by Phonography, however no more Royd Speakers were built.

== Career highlights ==
The most famous and successful loudspeaker Joe Akroyd made was the Royd Minstrel. Launched in 1993, the Minstrel was a short, compact floor standing speaker, with a stand that angled it back slightly. It featured a side exiting reflex bass port and sold for £230-£300 depending on finish. Royd speakers remain in high demand, with their vintage continually elevating second hand prices.
