= Haughton Ackroyd =

English footballer

Personal information
- Full name: Haughton Ackroyd
- Date of birth: 24 June 1894
- Place of birth: Todmorden, England
- Date of death: 14 February 1979 (aged 84)
- Place of death: Southport, England
- Height: 6 ft 0 in (1.83 m)
- Position: Goalkeeper

Senior career*
Years	Team	Apps	(Gls)
1921–1922	Wigan Borough	5	(0)
- Lytham
- * Club domestic league appearances and goals

Haughton Ackroyd (24 June 1894 – 14 February 1979) was a footballer who played in the Football League for Wigan Borough. Born in Todmorden, England, Ackroyd made his debut for Wigan in March 1922 in a 3–3 draw against Darlington. He made five league appearances for the club before being released at the end of the 1921–22 season.
