= Alfred Ackroyd =

English cricketer

Alfred Ackroyd (29 August 1858 – 3 October 1927) was an English amateur first-class cricketer, who played for Yorkshire County Cricket Club.

Ackroyd was born in Oakroyd Hall, Birkenshaw, Bradford, Yorkshire, England. He was a right-handed batsman and a right-arm fast bowler. He made two appearances for Yorkshire, and averaged 15 with the bat, and 10.66 with the ball taking three wickets. A fast bowler with a fierce break-back, his action was strongly criticised in Lillywhite's Companion for 1880.

Ackroyd died in Eccles, Lancashire, England, in October 1927, at the age of 59.
