= Patricia Batty Shaw =

Patricia Batty Shaw, CBE (born Patricia Heckels, 1928–2004) was a chairwoman of the United Kingdom's National Federation of Women's Institutes.

She was born at Epsom, Surrey, England, on 18 November 1928. Her father was a general practitioner and medical officer to the Derby horse race.

She was educated at Wimbledon High School and trained as a medical social worker (almoner) at Southampton University. She then worked at Guy's Hospital and St Thomas' Hospital. On 7 May 1954, she married Dr. Anthony Batty Shaw at St Martins, Epsom and took his double-barrelled surname. Anthony was a senior physician at Norfolk and Norwich Hospital and was later known for his work as a medical historian. They later lived in Norwich, then in nearby Barford, where she joined the Barford and Wramplingham Women's Institute, becoming its secretary. She became the National Federation's chair of education, vice-chair and, from 1977 to 1981, its chair. She then began a role with H.M Development Commission and advised the government on funding applications from the Development Fund designed to assist rural communities. In the 1980s Shaw presided over the WI during the "Jam and Jerusalem" crisis, where the organisation was threatened with being unable to sell home-made pickles, due to lack of hygiene control.

She also served in other voluntary roles, for example chairing the Norfolk Rural Community Council, as president of the Royal Norfolk Agricultural Association in 1993, and county president of the Girl Guides. She was a magistrate and chairman of the Wymondham bench.

She appeared as a castaway on the BBC Radio programme Desert Island Discs on 22 July 1978, and was appointed a Commander of the Order of the British Empire (CBE) in 1981.

She died on 11 June 2004 at Norfolk and Norwich University Hospital and was buried at St Botolph Church Bartford. Her husband and daughter, Susan Elisabeth survived her.

== Bibliography ==
- Batty Shaw, Patricia; Batty Shaw, Anthony (1997). Wymondham Magistrates and Their Court House: The Bridewell, Wymondham.
