= Harold Ackroyd =

Recipient of the Victoria Cross

Harold Ackroyd VC MC
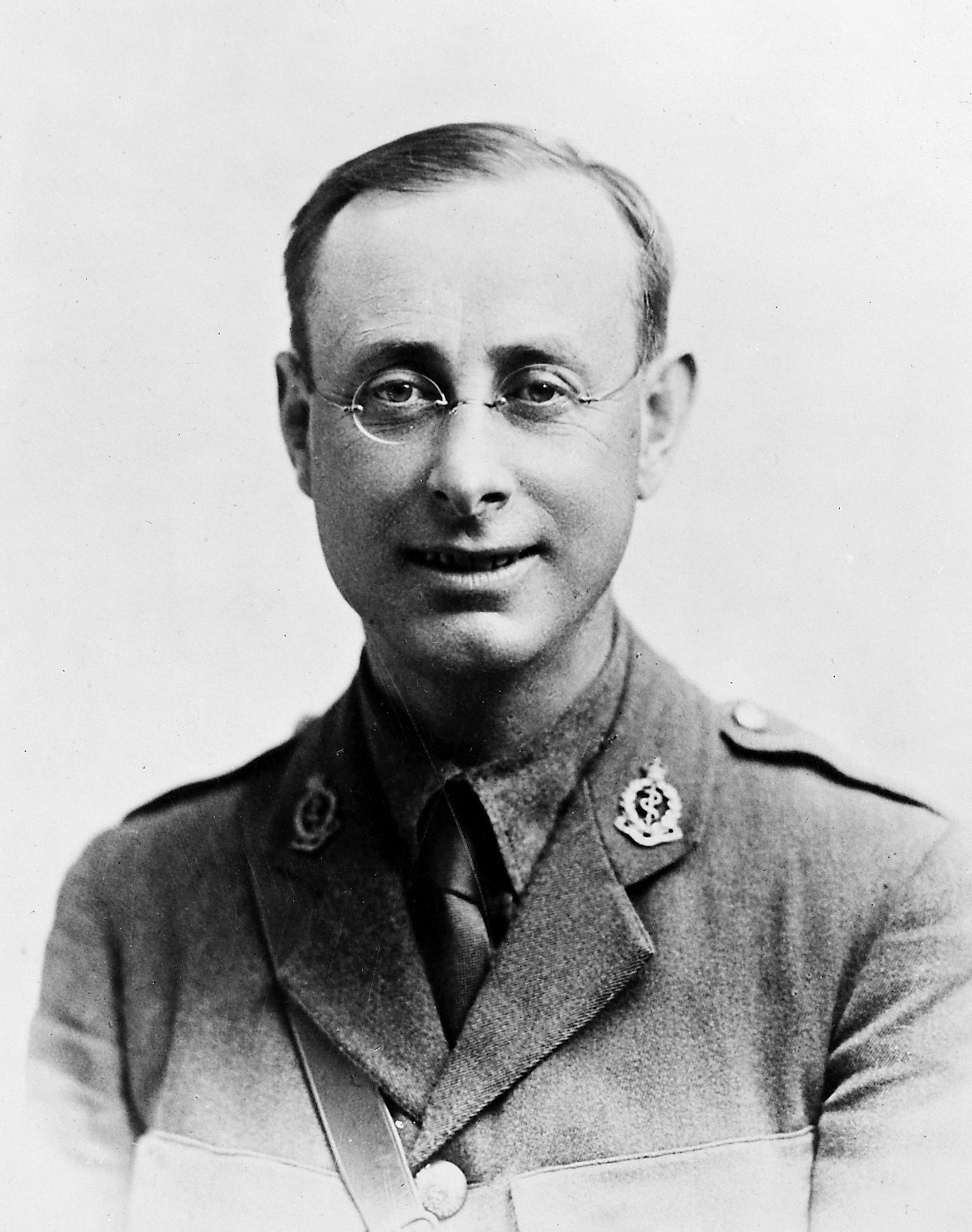
- Born: 18 July 1877; Southport, Lancashire, England
- Died: 11 August 1917 (aged 40); Passchendaele salient, Belgium
- Burial place: Birr Cross Roads Cemetery, Zillebeke
- Military career
- Allegiance: United Kingdom
- Branch: British Army
- Service years: 1915–1917
- Rank: Captain
- Units: Royal Army Medical Corps
- Conflicts: First World War: Western Front; Battle of the Somme; Battle of Delville Wood; Battle of Passchendaele; Battle of Pilckem Ridge; Capture of Westhoek †
- Awards: Victoria Cross; Military Cross

Harold Ackroyd (18 July 1877 – 11 August 1917) was a British physician, scientific researcher, army officer and a recipient of the Victoria Cross, the highest award for gallantry in the face of the enemy that can be awarded to British and Commonwealth forces.

An officer with the Royal Army Medical Corps during the First World War, he was posthumously awarded the Victoria Cross for his actions in late July–early August 1917, during the Battle of Passchendaele.

== Early life ==
Ackroyd was born on 18 July 1877 in Roe Lane, Southport, Lancashire to Ellen and Edward Ackroyd. His father was chairman of the Cheshire Lines & Southport Extension Railway Company.

Ackroyd was educated locally at Mintholme College, Southport, and Shrewsbury School. Following his elder brother Edward, who had matriculated in 1893 he then entered Gonville and Caius College, Cambridge in October 1896. He completed his Bachelor of Arts degree in 1899, before he did some travelling and then spent one year in the research group of Gowland Hopkins before continuing his medical studies at Guy's Hospital, London. He gained his BC in 1903, MB (Bachelor of Medicine) in 1904 and his MD (Doctor of Medicine) in 1910.

== Medical career ==
He worked at Guy's Hospital in 1904–05, London before serving as the House Surgeon at Queen's Hospital in Birmingham. He was then employed at the David Lewis Northern Hospital, Liverpool 1905–06 before in 1908 securing an "Ordinary Research Scholarship" from the British Medical Association, which allowed him to engage in research work at Cambridge, initially at the Strangeways Research Hospital. By the time he renewed his research scholarship in 1910 Ackroyd was working in the Pharmacological Laboratory with Walter E. Dixon. He then began research work in association with Frederick Gowland Hopkins, with the pair co-authoring a number of research papers.

== Military service ==
When the First World War began in 1914 Ackroyd was nearly 37 but, despite his age, occupation and being married with three small children, he joined up and on 15 February 1915 was commissioned a Temporary Lieutenant in the Royal Army Medical Corps (RAMC). In July 1915, Ackroyd was sent to France, where he was attached as a medical officer to the 6th Battalion of the Royal Berkshire Regiment, (Princess Charlotte of Wales's), part of the 53rd Brigade, 18th (Eastern) Division. After his promotion to temporary captain in 1916, he saw action at the Battle of the Somme in July 1916. On 19 July he was present at the three days of fighting at Delville Wood which became the graveyard of the 53rd Brigade as originally constituted. Under heavy shelling and braving snipers, Ackroyd remained cool and methodical, saving many lives. No less than 11 officers singled him out for praise in their written reports and he was recommended for the Victoria Cross. At one point, Ackroyd was blown into the air by an exploding shell.

On 19 July 1916 he was awarded the Military Cross:

For conspicuous gallantry and devotion to duty during operations. He attended the wounded under heavy fire, and finally, when he had seen that all our wounded from behind the line had been got in, he went out beyond the front line and brought in both our own and enemy wounded, although continually sniped at.

Ackroyd rescued many of the wounded from the 1st South African Infantry Brigade and there is a memorial to him in the room commemorating Delville Wood at Fort Beaufort Historical Museum, South Africa. Showing signs of immense strain and nervous exhaustion he was reluctantly, invalided home on 11 August 1916 to commence six weeks of leave. Of the opinion that he had recovered Ackroyd by September was asking the Army Medical Board to allow him to return to his regiment in France, which he accomplished in December 1916.

=== Ypres ===
The 6th Battalion of the Royal Berkshire Regiment was fighting in the Third Battle of Ypres, known as the Battle of Passchendaele, which commenced on 31 July 1917 when the following deed took place for which he received 23 separate recommendations for the Victoria Cross, and which was subsequently awarded:

For most conspicuous bravery. During recent operations Capt. Ackroyd displayed the greatest gallantry and devotion to duty. Utterly regardless of danger, he worked continuously for many hours up and down and in front of the line tending the wounded and saving the lives of officers and men. In so doing he had to move across the open under heavy machine-gun, rifle and shell fire. He carried a wounded officer to a place of safety under very heavy fire. On another occasion he went some way in front of our advanced line and brought in a wounded man under continuous sniping and machine-gun fire. His heroism was the means of saving many lives, and provided a magnificent example of courage, cheerfulness, and determination to the fighting men in whose midst he was carrying out his splendid work. This gallant officer has since been killed in action.

Ackroyd was subsequently killed on 11 August 1917 in Jargon Trench on the western edge of Glencorse Wood, Ypres, Belgium by a sniper. His second in command, Acting Corporal Albert Scriven, wrote to Ackroyd's widow describing what happened:

“I was acting orderly corporal and on hearing the news I took a party of stretcher bearers but on arrival found he was dead. There were six other poor fellows in the same shell hole who met the same fate, it was a perfect death trap. He was visiting each company about 150 yds ahead of us to see if there were any wounded to attend to and was shot in the head by a sniper.”

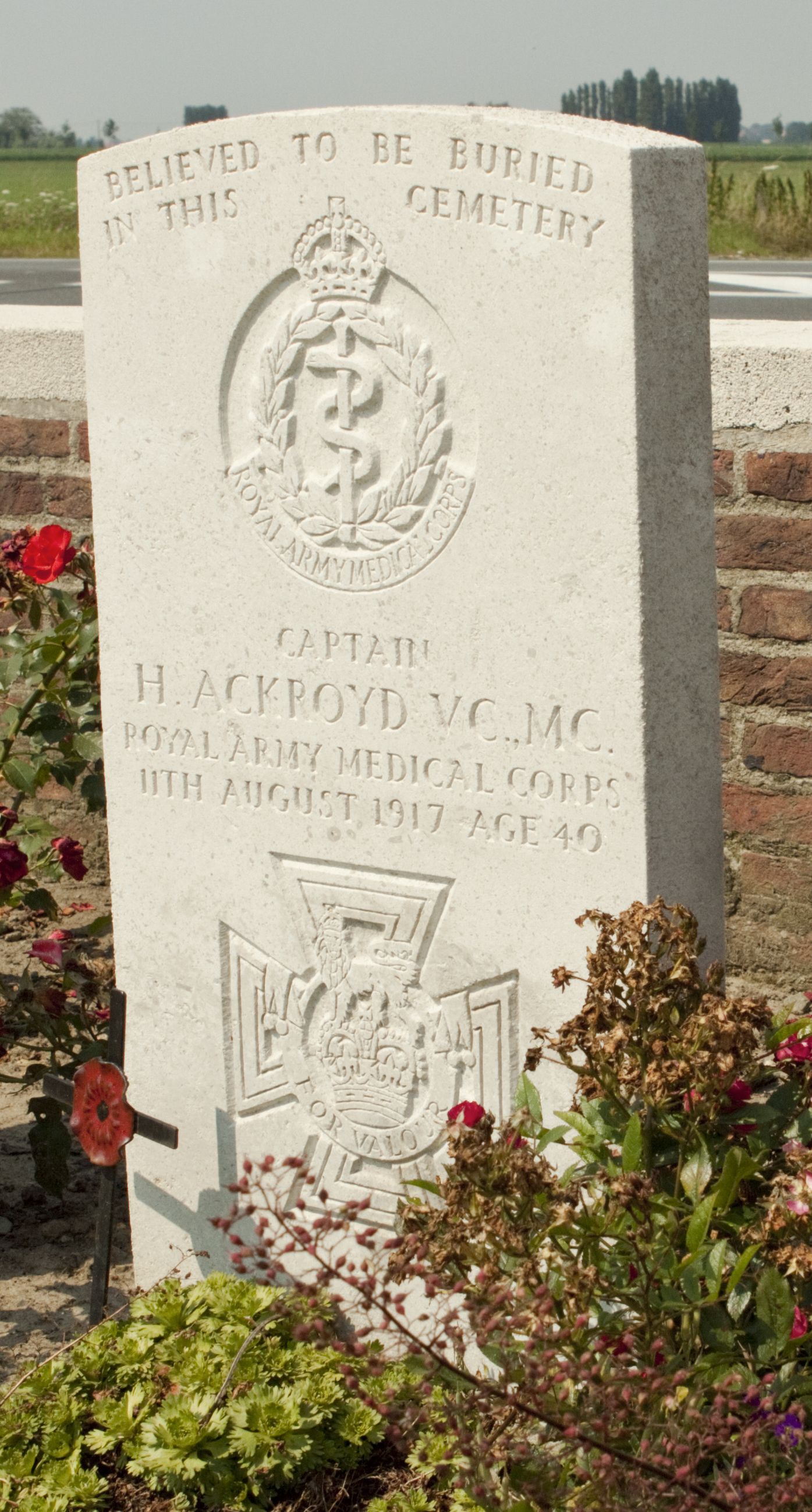
Ackroyd's CWGC headstone

Ackroyd's body was evacuated and buried. A headstone at Birr Cross Roads Cemetery, Zillebeke near Ypres reads "Believed to be buried in this cemetery." His Victoria Cross (number 851) was presented by King George V at Buckingham Palace to his widow Mabel and son Stephen on 26 September 1917.

== Personal life ==
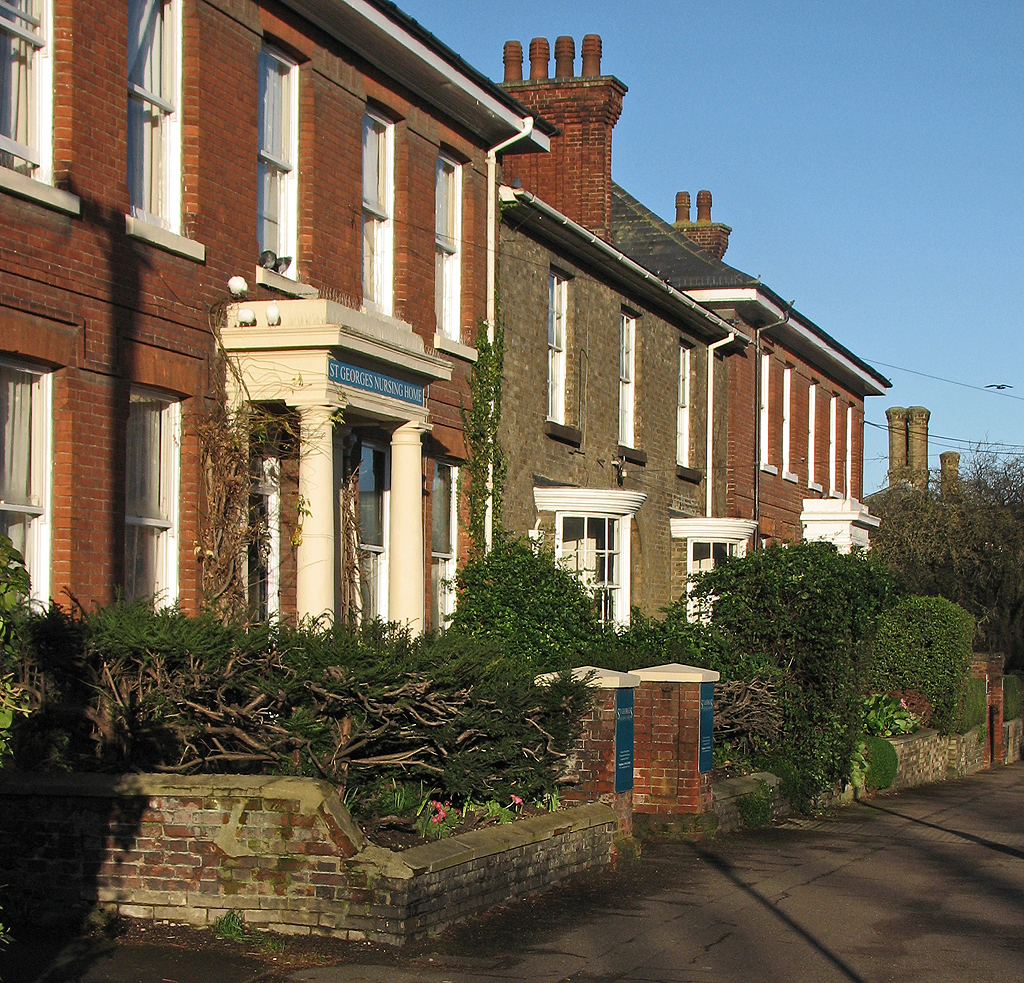
46 Kneesworth Street, Royston

Ackroyd met Mabel Robina Smythe (1877–1947) matron of Strangeways Hospital, Cambridge while he was working there. They were married on 1 August 1908 and lived in Great Shelford, Cambridgeshire where their children Ursula (1909–1993) and Stephen (1912–1963) were born. They then moved to Brooklands, 46 Kneesworth Street, Royston, Hertfordshire, where Anthony (1914–1988) was born.

== Memorials ==
There is a memorial to Ackroyd on the street-facing wall and inside his former house at 46 Kneesworth Street in Royston. His name on the Royston war memorial in Melbourn Street, Royston, which was unveiled on 26 March 1922. Ackroyd Road in Royston has been named after him.

== The medals ==
The medals of Harold Ackroyd

His medals were purchased from his descendants in 2003 by Lord Michael Ashcroft. The proceeds from the sale were used to endow an annual medical scholarship at Gonville and Caius College, Cambridge, Harold Ackroyd's alma mater. In addition, the college agreed to arrange an annual memorial lecture on a scientific subject connected with medicine. Ackroyd's medals were subsequently put on public display at the Imperial War Museum, London.

Replicas of Ackroyd's Victoria Cross, his Military Cross and other war medals are on display at the RAMC HQ in Millbank, London along with a painting of him winning the Victoria Cross.
