= William France Sr. (cabinetmaker) =

William France Sr. was born in the small agricultural village of Whittington, six miles north of Lancaster, where he was christened on 7 January 1727 the second son of Edward, a yeoman farmer, and Agnes France. His elder brother, John, was christened on 27 March 1725 and was apprenticed to a cabinetmaker in Lancaster where he married Elizabeth Townson the daughter of John Townson, a joiner, in 1747. (Note: It is suggested in 'The Dictionary of English Furniture Makers 1660–1840 by Beard & Gilbert' that William France was born in London in 1734. Extensive genealogical research has shown this to be inaccurate. see reference 1 for Geoffrey Castle.)

== Early years ==
William originally trained as an upholsterer, possibly in Lancaster, the same as his brother John. The first written evidence of his career is in 1759 in London, aged 32, when his name appears in the bank account of John Cobb for payments of his salary. Vile and Cobb were, at that time, one of London's leading cabinetmakers and upholsterers and George, Prince of Wales, was among their customers.

When George II died in 1760, the Prince of Wales succeeded his grandfather as George III. In the same year Vile and Cobb were appointed cabinetmakers and upholsterers to the King. This proved to be a very busy time for the partnership and William France, as the king married Duchess Sophia Charlotte of Mecklenburg-Strelitz in 1761 and apartments in St James's Palace were refurbished for the new queen and work was also required for the Coronation. Then in 1762 the King purchased Buckingham House, now the site of Buckingham Palace, and the house was refurbished as the home of the King and Queen.

== Main career ==
In 1764 the partnership between Vile and Cobb was dissolved on Vile's retirement and although Cobb continued in business on his own account, William France and his colleague, John Bradburn cabinetmaker, took over their business, their premises in Long Acre and their customers, who included the royal family. They were granted the Royal Warrant in July 1764 and although much of the work had been completed to Buckingham House, renamed the Queen's House, they completed the Saloon and over the coming years supplied furniture and furnishings to the growing royal family. During this period William's older brother John and younger brother Robert both worked for the business, although neither enjoyed the acclaim of their brother William.

Among Vile and Cobb's customers for whom they continued to work, were Princess Augusta, the King's mother for Carlton House, Lord Coventry at Croome Court, Worcestershire, Sir Lawrence Dundas at 19 Arlington Street, London and Moor Park, Hertfordshire and John Chute at his London house in Charles Street, Mayfair. France also supplied furniture and fittings to Lord Mansfield. for Kenwood, Hampstead. These commissions are known because the bills have survived and much of the work was in association with the great Scottish Architect and furniture designer Robert Adam.

An interesting series of documents were preserved amongst Lord Mansfield's papers with regard to the construction of the majestic salon at Kenwood by Robert Adam. Thomas Chippendale was contracted to supply a sequence of looking-glass plates, the frames of which were made by William France to Adam's design.

Chippendale obviously encountered difficulty in fulfilling his promise as, ten days after the allotted two months had expired, a memorandum was drawn up giving him an extra three months to deliver the consignment. Under the terms of this new bond Lord Mansfield agreed to advance half the sum to William France on the understanding that it would be refunded if Chippendale defaulted. Although the agreement had been drawn up and signed by Robert Adam, its transaction was the responsibility of the cabinet-maker in charge; so, instead of paying the £170 directly to Chippendale or Adam his Lordship gave it to France who was responsible not only for handing it over to Chippendale but for returning it if the deal collapsed. The Glass was evidently delivered within the three-month term as Lord Mansfield paid the balance due in November – the receipt for payment in full being jointly signed by Thomas Chippendale Junior and William France. To conclude the transaction Chippendale was required to confirm that he had received payment in full at the foot of the original estimate. This contract has been cited as evidence of Chippendale's devious business ethics, but in fact the same procedure applied to other agents who worked under Adam's personal direction. At the time Chippendale was under great financial strain and found credit hard to secure which may explain his request for a cash advance. The looking-glass was used for two mirror-lined recesses flanking the chimney-piece in the salon at Kenwood. The elaborate carved and gilt frames were made by William France in 1769–70 at a cost of £149 8s.0d.; he also supplied the pair of sofas which originally stood against the dado in each alcove.

== Royal funerals ==
Apart from being Cabinet makers and Upholsterers from 1765 the France family were also the Royal undertakers and a list of these Royal family funerals overseen by William France Sr. follows.

- The Duke of Cumberland (younger son of George II) 1765
- Edward Duke of York (2nd son of Frederick Prince of Wales) 1767
- Princess Louisa Ann (daughter of Frederick Prince of Wales) 1768
- Princess Dowager of Wales (wife of Frederick Prince of Wales) 1772

== Latter years ==
By the late 1760s the partnership between France and Bradburn had been dissolved and William France had moved to premises at 101 St Martins Lane, very close to the premises of Thomas Chippendale at nos 60/61, where the France family continued to trade until 1804. Both the original partners continued working for the Royal Family with William France trading as both an upholsterer and a cabinetmaker.

One of William France's ledgers has survived and is in the National Archives at Kew. It covers his work for the Great Wardrobe and is inscribed 'Great Wardrobe Fair Leidger 1771 Mr France's'. The ledger commences in April 1771 and ends after William France's death.

William France died on 12 February 1773 and he was buried in the church of St Martin in the Fields. (Note: Westminster City Archives: St Martin-in-the-Fields Parish Register, burial of William France. He was buried in the vestry vault, but his remains were removed in 1857/58 to catacomb B under the church (F6102 and 419/29).) In his will dated 9 February he bequeathed the business to his elder brother, John, and his nephew Edward France, John's eldest son then aged 24. (Note: Contrary to the major 'recognised' works on 18th century Cabinetmakers (e.g. The Dictionary of English Furniture Makers 1660 to 1840 et al.), Edward was not William Sr.'s son but his nephew. see reference 1 for Geoffrey Castle.) Because of Edward's age and inexperience the ongoing partnership was not granted the Royal Warrant. It is also known from legal documents produced after the death of John France in 1775 that William France's business was in a poor financial state at the time of his death and it had not been possible to pay the legacies made in his will.

Following the deaths of John and Edward in 1775 and 1777 respectively, the business eventually passed on to William France Jr., Edward's younger brother.

== Principal commissions (1763–1770) ==
- Moor Park, Herts & 19 Arlington Street, London for Sir Lawrence Dundas, 1st Baronet
- Croome Court, Worcester for George William Coventry, 6th Earl of Coventry
- St James's Palace, Queens House, His Majestys Apartment, Lodge at Richmond, Pavilions at Hampton Court for George III
- Buckingham House for George III
- The Vyne, Hampshire & Charles Street, London for John Chute
- Burlington House, Piccadilly for William Henry Cavendish Cavendish-Bentinck, 3rd Duke of Portland
- Syon House, Isleworth, Middx for Hugh Percy, 1st Duke of Northumberland
- Kenwood House, Hampstead Heath, London for William Murray, 1st Earl of Mansfield

== Sources ==
- Geoffrey Castle – 'The France Family of Upholsterers and Cabinet-Makers' – Furniture History Society Journal Vol.XLI pp 25–43, Published 2005
- Ayling, Stanley (1972). George the Third – London: Collins. ISBN 0-00-211412-7
- G Beard & C Gilbert – 'Dictionary of English Furniture Makers 1660–1840' 1986 – Furniture History Society (ISBN 0 901286 18 4)
- Percy Hetherington Fitzgerald – The good Queen Charlotte, 1899
- G Beard – 'Upholsterers and Interior Furnishing in England 1539–1840' 1997 – Dewey (ISBN 0 300071 35 3)
- Eileen Harris – The Furniture of Robert Adam (London:Academy Editions, 1973) – (ISBN 0854589295)
- Pat Kirkham – 'The London Furniture Trade 1700–1870' 1988 – Furniture History Society (ISBN 0 903335 06 9)
- Sir Ambrose Heal – 'London Furniture Makers 1660–1840' 1988 – Dover NY (ISBN 0 486229 03 3)
- Ralph Edwards & Margaret Jourdain – 'Georgian Cabinet Makers' 1944, 1946; revised 1951 (3rd edition 1955)
- Christopher Gilbert – 'The Life and work of Thomas Chippendale' 1978 – Studio Vista (ISBN 0 289708 39 7)
- Anthony Coleridge – 'Chippendale Furniture: the work of Thomas Chippendale and his contemporaries in the rococo taste' 1968 Faber (ISBN 0 571084 05 2)
