= John Ackroyd =

John Ackroyd may refer to:

- John Ackroyd (footballer, born 1868) (1868–?), footballer for Grimsby Town and Rotherham Town
- John Ackroyd (footballer, born 1895) (1895–1967), footballer for Exeter City, Grimsby Town and Rotherham County
- John Ackroyd (engineer) (1937–2021), designer of the world land speed record car Thrust2
- John Arthur Ackroyd (1949–2016), American serial killer and rapist
