= William France Jr. (cabinetmaker) =

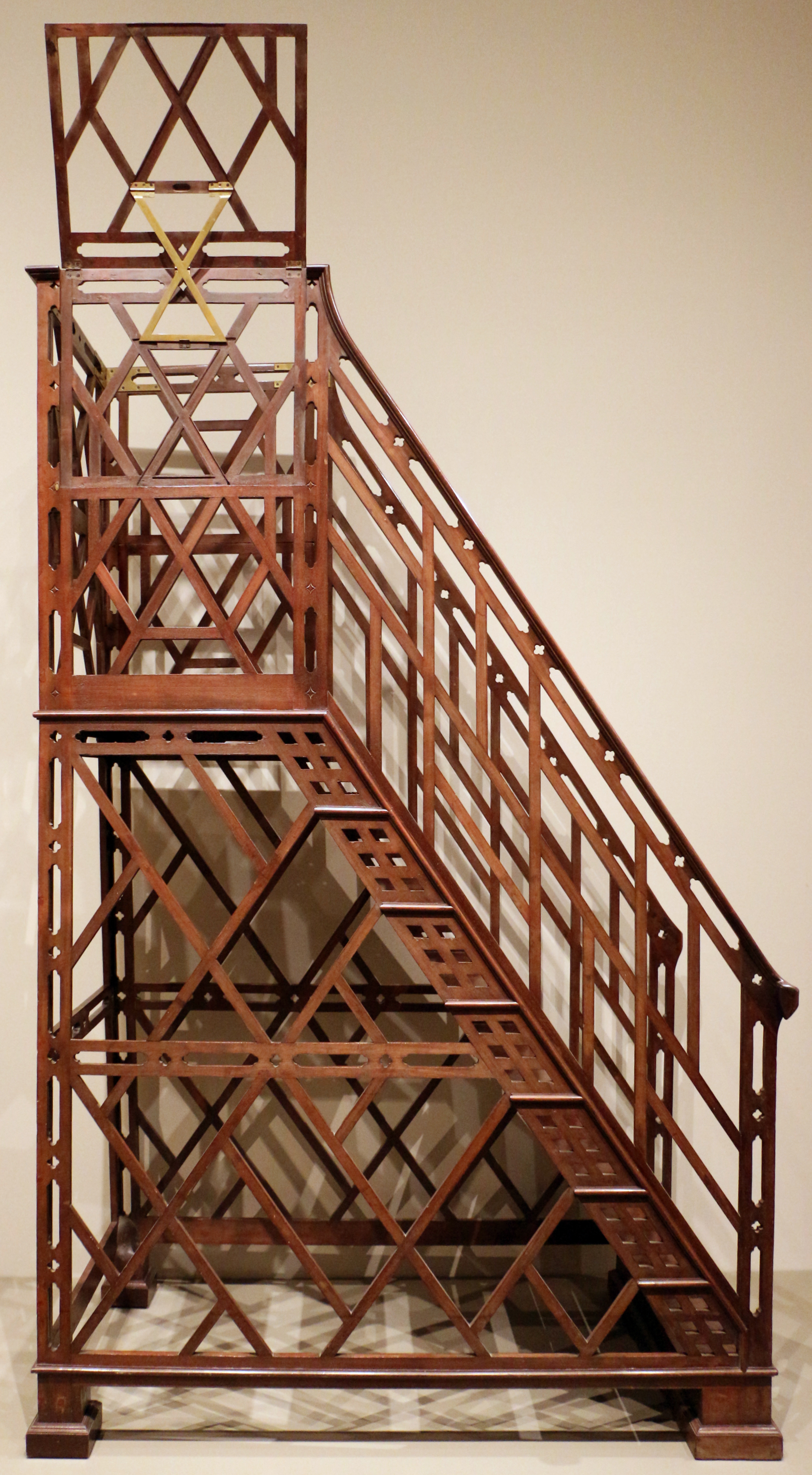
Library stairs, from Badminton House, Gloucester (1782), Art Institute of Chicago

William France Jr. was a cabinetmaker and upholsterer in 18th century London and a member of the well known France family who held the Royal Warrant for over half a century. He was the nephew of William France Sr. and younger brother of Edward France, the former being cabinetmaker to the Royal Household. He was born in 1759 and died in 1838 in Boulogne, France. He was made a Freeman of Lancaster in 1785–86.

== Early life ==
William France Jr. was the second son of John France, cabinetmaker, and nephew of William France Sr. (Note: Contrary to the major 'recognised' works on 18th century Cabinetmakers (e.g. The Dictionary of English Furniture Makers 1660 to 1840 et al), William Jr. was not William Sr.'s son but his nephew. see reference 2 for Geoffrey Castle.) He was christened at St Martin-in-the-Fields on 14 January 1759. His elder brother Edward France was formally apprenticed to his uncle William France Sr., and when he died in 1773, his younger nephew William Jr. was not left a share in the business as he was only 14 at the time.

However, the business was divided between his father and brother, John and Edward and by the time they had both died in 1775 and 1777 respectively he had inherited the whole business. As he was not of full legal age trustees were appointed and Samuel Beckwith, (who had worked for Thomas Chippendale), joined the partnership which traded initially as Beckwith and France at 101 St Martins Lane.

== France & Beckwith ==
Samuel Beckwith was married to Jane Donowell, whose father was a surveyor and managed Lord Salisbury's London Estate. It was through this contact that in 1780 the partnership was appointed to supply furnishings to Hatfield House, much of which is still in the house. (Note: A bill dated 1790 in the Hatfield House archives records work carried out by the firm of 'France & Beckwith'. The bill also details that two men from the same firm carried a large Ivory model of the 'Chinese Temple of the Moon' on foot from London to Hatfield in 1786. The model was thought to be a diplomatic gift from the Chinese Emperor to George III and stands at the foot of a staircase in Hatfield House.) (Note: The following are in Beckwith's a/c of Mch 1790. 2nd Supp. 4/165. Small oval frame for a Lion with neat carved ribband knot, gilt in burnished gold & glazed. Bronzing the figure of King James & 2 medallions. 2 antique vases with treble branches to stand on your Lordship's Thermes. Carving 4 lions as large as life to match old ones to fix on top of the Hatfield House: ditto 4 large eagles. Rich carved stand for a piece of antique work. Gold frame "to the impression or drawing of a Seal, found in Hatfield Park". Moving from Lord Hillsborough's to St Martin's Lane the large Ivory Palace, with ornaments, figures &c with the plate glass cover. Packing ditto & 2 men with all the ivory work &c walking to Hatfield: unpacking & fixing.) Lord Salisbury was appointed Lord Chamberlain in 1783 and in 1784 Beckwith and France received the Royal Warrant as cabinetmakers and upholsterers to the king, an appointment which William France held for the remainder of his working life. The partnership supplied a vast number of items to the royal household, not only for the use of George III but for his children, court officials and increasingly government departments. Much of this furniture, after over 200 years, has been dispersed but some items remain in the Royal Collection.

In 1787 William France married Phillis Beckwith a cousin of Samuel Beckwith, they had seven children the eldest son William Beckwith France was later destined to join the business. (Note: It had been previously suggested that it was Thomas that joined the firm in 1809 but this has been proved to be incorrect.)

Other than the items which were supplied to the Royal Family and are recorded in the Lord Chamberlain's Bill Books, held in the National Archives, we know little of the partnership's other customers. It is known that they supplied a table to Lord Verulam and continued to work for Lord Mansfield at Kenwood and Henry Somerset, 5th Duke of Beaufort acquired a set of magnificent steps for his library at Badminton House, Gloucestershire from them in 1782, but otherwise little can be attributed to them as a partnership.

Samuel Beckwith died in 1804 and the business was split between William France and Beckwith's son Samuel who continued to trade from St Martins Lane. Whilst France, who continued to hold the Royal Warrant, moved to premises at 31 Pall Mall, convenient for St James's Palace where the Lord Chamberlain's offices were located. One of France's account books survives in the National Archives covering the years from 1804 to 1811 and gives the details of items he supplied to over 200 customers. These included The Duke of Bedford, Lord Packenham, Sir William Oglander, Sir Jacob Ashley for Melton Constable, Norfolk and Lord Rivers for his house at Stratfield Saye, Hampshire. Lord Rivers later sold the property to the Duke of Wellington and some of France's furniture is still in the house.

== Royal funerals ==
Apart from being Cabinet makers and Upholsterers the France family were also the Royal undertakers and France and his successors (Bantings) organized the funerals of members of the Royal Family until the 1920s including those of George III and George IV. A list of these Royal family funerals follows.

- Prince Henry Duke of Cumberland (4th son of Frederick Prince of Wales) 1790
- Prince William Duke of Gloucester (3rd son of Frederick Prince of Wales) 1805
- Princess Amelia (daughter of George III) 1811
- Princess Augusta Frederica of Great Britain the Duchess of Brunswick (sister of George III) 1813
- Princess Charlotte of Wales (daughter of the then-future George IV) 1817
- Queen Charlotte – Sophia Charlotte of Mecklenburg-Strelitz (Wife of George III) 1818
- King George III – 1820
- King George IV – 1830 (conducted by Bantings, France & co)

An interesting note is that in the list of funeral expenses submitted to the Lord Chamberlain's office in 1820 the Royal undertakers Messrs. Banting and France submitted a bill for £49 10s 0d for ‘police officers attending at.... manufactory to keep the peace.’ Such an item became a regular feature of their expense accounts. In 1830, at the time of George IV's funeral, when they were asked to clarify this item they made it clear that.....

‘The moment it became known to the public that the works of the coffin etc. were in progress at the manufactory, the premises were beset by thousands. The preparations were all at a standstill and could not have been completed without assistance to keep them off, so great was the interest excited that it was a matter of necessity to employ persons night and day until the coffin was sent off to Windsor.'

What Messrs. Banting and France did not indicate to the Lord Chamberlain was that they had taken full advantage of this public interest by providing a special viewing area where a curious public (presumably future clients) might view the coffin when finished, as well as offering for sale a print of the coffin as shown in their viewing window.

== Lord Nelson's funeral ==
William France was also involved with the state funerals of Lord Nelson in 1806 as well as William Pitt the Younger in 1807.

The State Funeral of Lord Nelson was particularly notable as it was one of only a few State Funerals given to a commoner (i.e. not a member of the Royal Family) but also because of the esteem in which he was held as a National Hero by the Nation. This was a major event and as such was too large for one Funeral Director to arrange and so the duties were shared. William France Jr. was responsible for the construction of the Coffin and the arrangements for the lying in state in the Painted Chamber at the Royal Naval Hospital, Greenwich. The coffin was a spectacular construction containing 10,000 Gilt Brass Nails costing the magnificent sum of 10 Guineas. Some of the accounts at the time are detailed below.

Adam Collingwood – Anecdotes on the Late Horatio Lord Viscount Nelson with the Funeral Ceremonies 1806

The painted chamber (now Painted Hall) having been fitted up for this melancholy spectacle with particular taste and elegance by Mr France a platform was erected along the chamber, with two divisions, one for the ingress and the other for egress of the spectators.

Naval Chronicle vol 15 1806

This coffin which is considered as the most elegant and superb ever seen in Europe, is the production of Mr France, undertaker of Pall Mall.

Richard Clarke – The Life of Horatio Lord Nelson 1813

This coffin was made by Mr Chittenden under the direction of Mr France of Pall Mall.... the coffin, after being exhibited at the house of Mr France, the undertaker in Pall Mall, was conveyed to Greenwich,

Sunday Reporter, 5 January 1806

Mr France, Upholder to the King, in Pall Mall, was on Thursday so obliging to the Public that he permitted all ranks of people, without distinction, to go into his house for the purpose of having a complete and close view of the magnificent State Coffin that is prepared, as the surcoat for the remains of our most illustrious Naval Hero.

The National Archive document LC 2/38/2 'Detailed Account of Funeral Expenses Viscount Nelson 1806'. Details Mr France's expenses including:

- 2.5 yards black silk velvet for the lid (£3.18.3)
- Covering outside coffin with office black velvet and above addition, finished with office nails ornaments and plate (£10.10.0)
- Covering with Office black baize 6 trestles to support the corpse at the Painted Hall Greenwich and at the Admiralty
- Making a large pall of office black velvet 7 breadths wide and 7 yards long lined with office black velvet (£2.12.6)
- Covering a state canopy frame with office fine black cloth within and outside valens fringed & covering the covers and cornices over the Body in the Painted Hall (£3.15.0)
- Use of 11 black ostrich plumes for the Canopy at Greenwich.5 days. (£10.10.0)
- Making covers to 10 high candlesticks of office cloth

== France & Banting ==
In 1807 William Beckwith France joined the firm and in 1809 they started trading as William France and Son, however in 1812 William Beckwith France left the business and his father replaced him with Thomas Banting and the firm's name changed to France and Banting. The business continued working for the Lord Chamberlain's office, although its style changed as new family members joined. An interesting commission was to supply furniture for Napoleon's use on St Helena, but the Emperor died before the items could be delivered and in May 1822 50 lots were sold by Christie's. Then in 1825 in consideration of a pension of £500 per annum and a partnership for his youngest son John Hale France, William retired and the firm traded as Banting, France and Banting. However John Hale France claimed that the Bantings were excluding him from his rights under the partnership and he brought an action against them. This matter was settled but the firm traded thereafter as Banting and Son thus ending the France connection with the business.

William France Jr. died, intestate and a widower, in 1838 in Boulogne, France aged 79, leaving an estate of under £50.

== Principal commissions ==
- Hatfield House & Town House, Stratford Place for Lord Salisbury
- Badminton House for Henry Somerset, 5th Duke of Beaufort
- 15 St James Square, 1 Hamilton Place & Stanhope Street, Mayfair for the Duke of Bedford
- Kensington Palace for the Duke of Sussex
- Carlton House, Swinley Lodge & Brighton Pavilion for the Royal Household
- Cranbourne Lodge for Princess Charlotte of Wales
- Military Chapel, Whitehall for George III
- Windsor Castle for George IV
- Ickworth House, Suffolk for Frederick William Hervey, 1st Marquess of Bristol
