= Hans Marchwitza =

German writer and poet (1890–1965)

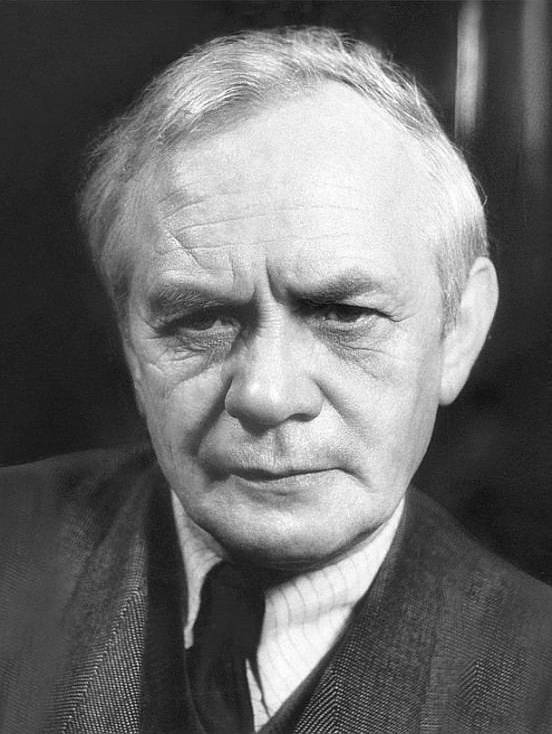
- Marchwitza c. 1950
- Born: 25 June 1890; Scharley, Province of Silesia, Kingdom of Prussia, German Empire
- Died: 17 January 1965 (aged 74); Potsdam, Bezirk Potsdam, East Germany
- Resting place: Zentralfriedhof Friedrichsfelde
- Occupations: Writer; Revolutionary; Miner
- Political party: USPD (1919–1920); KPD (1920–1946); SED (after 1946)
- Other political affiliations: AAUD (1920)
- Spouse: Hilde Stern
- Military career
- Allegiance: German Empire; Revolutionaries; Spanish Republic
- Branch: Imperial German Army; Ruhr Red Army; International Brigades
- Service years: 1915–1918; 1920; 1936–1938
- Rank: Lieutenant
- Units: XIII International Brigade; Chapaev Battalion
- Conflicts: World War I; Ruhr Uprising; Spanish Civil War (WIA)

Hans Marchwitza (25 June 1890 – 17 January 1965) was a German communist revolutionary, proletarian writer and poet. A miner by trade and a veteran of the First World War, he fought in the Ruhr Red Army during the Ruhr Uprising and the International Brigades during the Spanish Civil War. He was later a prominent cultural figure in East Germany.

== Life ==
Marchwitza was the son of miner Thomas Marchwitza and his wife Thekla Maxisch, and was born in Scharley (Szarlej) (now a part of Piekary Śląskie) near Beuthen in Upper Silesia. Already at fourteen years old (1904) Marchwitza was working underground in the mines. In 1910 he was hired to work in the Ruhr area.

Two years later, however, he became unemployed because of his participation in a strike. Until he was drafted into the military in 1915, he worked as a laborer in odd jobs. He served on the Western Front until 1918.

In 1919 he joined the Independent Social Democratic Party of Germany. In the following year, he fought as a platoon leader for the Red Ruhr Army against the Kapp Putsch, Freikorps groups, and the Reichswehr during the Ruhr Uprising. In 1920, he joined the Communist Party of Germany. When France occupied the Ruhr area, he fought in resistance.

In the meantime, he again became unemployed because of his participation in a strike. In this period, he wrote his first literary pieces. Alexander Abusch, an editor for the Ruhr-Echo supported him and published his initial piece. After 1924, he published in the Communist newspapers the Rote Fahne (Red Banner) and the Rote Front.

In 1929, he was invited along with a number of other journalists and writers to visit the Soviet Union. In 1930, he published his first book Sturm auf Essen, reporting on the fighting in the Ruhr Area in 1920. After the seizure of power by the Nazis in 1933, he fled to Switzerland, but was expelled by 1934. Until 1935 he worked for the Communist Party in the French occupied Saarland, then fought as a lieutenant in the Chapaev Battalion of the XIII International Brigade in the Spanish Civil War from 1936 until he was wounded in 1937. He served on the general staff of the International Brigades until 1938.

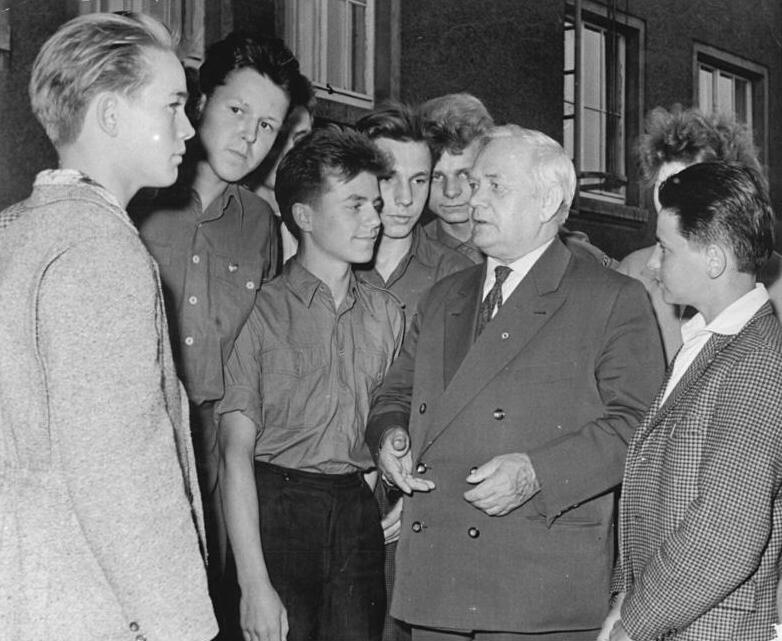
Marchwitza speaking with members of the Free German Youth, 18 June 1959

In 1938, he attempted to cross from Spain to France but was arrested and detained by the French. In 1941, he succeeded in fleeing to the United States. There he was detained but was later allowed to work in construction and other odd jobs. In 1946 he returned to Germany, first to Stuttgart and then in 1947 to Babelsberg in the Soviet Occupation Zone. He became a founding member of the Academy of the Arts of East Germany. For this action, in 1950 he received the National Prize of East Germany, a prize he received again in 1955 and 1964. He also became a cultural attaché in Prague in 1950, an office he held until 1955. For his seventieth birthday he was awarded the Karl Marx Order and the honorary title of Dr. phil. h.c. from Humboldt University.

Marchwitza died on 17 January 1965 at age 75 in Potsdam. He was cremated and honoured with burial in the Pergolenweg Ehrengrab section of Berlin's Friedrichsfelde Cemetery.

== Works ==
His autobiographical trilogy "Die Kumiaks" (1934, 1952, 1959) and autobiography "Meine Jugend" (1947) depict vivid scenes of the life of German working families in Silesia and the Ruhr Area.

- Sturm auf Essen (Reportage, 1930) [English translation: Storm Over the Ruhr, Martin Lawrence, 1932]
- Walzwerk (Novel, 1932)
- Die Kumiaks (Novel, 1934)
- Wetterleuchten: Gedichte. A collection of anti-fascist poems (1942)
- Meine Jugend (1947)
- WIn Frankreich (1949)
- Unter uns (narrative, 1950)
- Die Heimkehr der Kumiaks (novel, 1952)
- Die Kumiaks und ihre Kinder (novel, 1959)
- In Amerika (novel, 1961)
- Gedichte (1965)

== Sources ==
- W. Ilberg: Hans Marchwitza. – Leipzig : Deutsche Akademie der Künste, 1971
- Fritz Matke (Hrsg.): Kamst zu uns aus dem Schacht : Erinnerungen an Hans Marchwitza. – Berlin : Verl. Tribüne, 1980
