= Walter Kraemer =

German politician and activist (1892–1941)

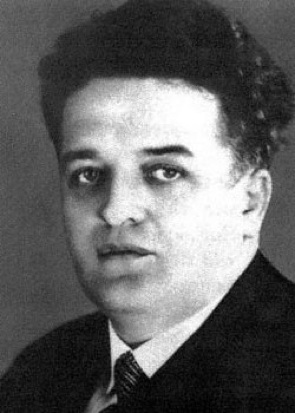
- Kraemer c. 1932

Member of the Landtag of Prussia for Düsseldorf West
- In office 25 May 1932 – 31 March 1933
- Preceded by: Multi-member district
- Succeeded by: Constituency abolished

Personal details
- Born: Walter Krämer; 21 June 1892 Siegen, Province of Westphalia, Kingdom of Prussia, German Empire
- Died: 6 November 1941 (aged 49) Goslar, Gau Southern Hanover-Brunswick, Nazi Germany
- Occupation: Politician; Party Functionary; Locksmith
- Awards: Righteous Among the Nations

Military service
- Allegiance: German Empire; Revolutionaries
- Branch/service: Imperial German Navy; Ruhr Red Army
- Years of service: 1914–1918; 1920
- Rank: Section Commander
- Battles/wars: World War I; Kiel Mutiny; Ruhr Uprising
- Other offices held: 1923–1925: Organizational Leader, Siegen KPD

Walter Kraemer (Krämer) (German pronunciation: [ˈvaltɐ ˈkʁɛːmɐ]; 21 June 1892 – 6 November 1941) was a German communist politician and member of the resistance against Nazism. From 1932 to 1933, he was a deputy of the Prussian Landtag for the Communist Party of Germany (KPD), then was arrested in 1933 and murdered in 1941 in a sub-camp of the concentration camp Buchenwald in Goslar. He assisted prisoners with getting medical help, becoming known as the "Doctor of Buchenwald", for which he received the posthumous title "Righteous among the Nations" from the State of Israel in 2000.

== Early life ==
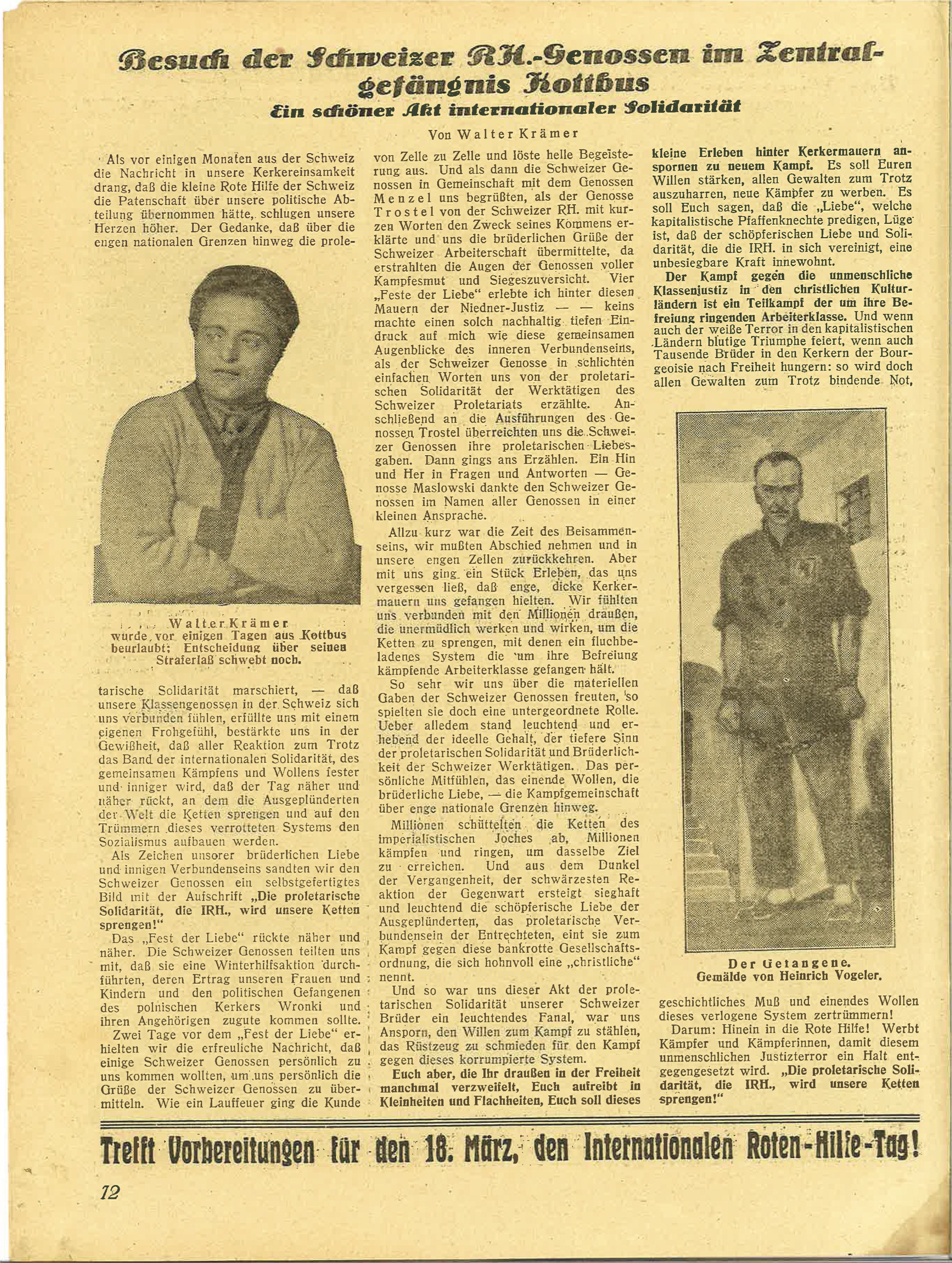
Kraemer (left) in Der Roter Helfer, February 1927

Walter Kraemer was born in Siegen on 21 June 1892. Trained as a professional locksmith, he joined the Imperial German Navy upon the outbreak of the First World War in 1914. Near the end of the war, he was detained for his involvement in the mutiny of revolutionary sailors in Kiel. Freed by the November Revolution of 1918, Kraemer returned to Siegen, where he was active in the workers' and soldiers committee. He joined the Independent Social Democratic Party of Germany (USPD) and took part in March 1920 in the fighting in the wake of the Kapp Putsch on the side of the Ruhr Red Army, in which he served as a section commander.

Towards the end of 1920, Kraemer joined the Communist Party of Germany (KPD), and was organizational leader in the Siegen subdistrict from 1923 to 1925. On 28 January 1925 he was sentenced to three years and six months in prison in the "Siegerland Communist Trial." but was released early in 1928 as part of a political amnesty. He worked as district secretary in Krefeld, Wuppertal, Kassel and Hanover, and served on the Siegen City Council. From 1932 to 1933 he was a member of the Prussian Landtag, representing Düsseldorf West. In May 1932, he was seriously injured in an attack by Nazi Landtag deputies on members of the KPD Group.

Kraemer was a member of the German Peace Society (DFG).

== Arrests and internment ==
The Reichstag fire in 1933 was attributed by the Nazi party to Communist "agitators." As a result, Kraemer was arrested on 28 February in Hannover. He was sentenced to three and a half years in prison for high treason. He was held from January 1935 in Hamelyn, Hanover and Hildesheim. He was arrested again, and on 15 January 1937, imprisoned at the Lichtenburg concentration camp, and transferred in August 1937 to the Buchenwald concentration camp.

After the expulsion of the "Kapos" who were mostly "habitual criminals" Kraemer acted in the camp underground as the KPD "Kapo" of the prisoner hospital. Through the initiative of Walter Kraemer conditions in the infirmary were changed fundamentally for the better. From this point the infirmary became a main base of the struggle against the SS and was a safe haven for vulnerable prisoners.

He acquired medical knowledge through self-study on organised patient care and also himself led operations by, for example, to ill-treatment by the SS to save the lives of injured inmates or those affected by frozen limbs. He was regarded as "a very excellent wound doctor and surgeon". He refused to allow Soviet prisoners of war to be released for execution by declaring they had tuberculosis. In early 1940, he managed to achieve the closure of the "murder cave" or "small camp" a special camp for mostly stateless Jews from Vienna and the Occupied Eastern Territories by declaring risk of disease to the SS and the surrounding villages; 500 barely living and emaciated inmates were transferred to the main camp.

== Death ==
In early November 1941, Kraemer was detained, along with his deputy Karl Peix, in the camp lock-up known as "the bunker", then transferred to the satellite camp Goslar. Both were declared by the camp commandant Karl-Otto Koch to have been "shot while escaping" by the SS on the morning of 6 November in a quarry near Hahndorf. There are different assumptions as to the motive for the murder. Kraemer stood for the illegal structures of political prisoners in the camp, which had remained not completely hidden from the SS. The camp Gestapo had noted in his file "Can not be dismissed!" Kraemer had a great knowledge of war crimes and violations by SS members to the rules and articles of war. He knew of the corruption of the camp commandant, Karl-Otto Koch, who had had treatment, in secret, for syphilis.

His widow Elisabeth ("Liesel") Kraemer, born Lehmann, received from the camp administration an urn containing his ashes, which was buried in November 1941 in Siegen. His death caught the attention of SS-Obergruppenführer Josias, Prince of Waldeck and Pyrmont, who had been successfully treated by Kraemer in the past, leading to the eventual investigation and conviction of Koch for embezzlement and multiple unauthorized murders, including that of Kraemer. Koch was sentenced to death, and executed in April 1945, about one week before the liberation of the camp. The investigation also led to the arrest of Hauptscharführer Johann Blank, a Buchenwald guard who played a leading role in the actual murder of Kraemer and Peix. Blank was charged with murder, manslaughter, embezzlement, and various other charges. He hanged himself in custody in February 1944.

== Legacy ==
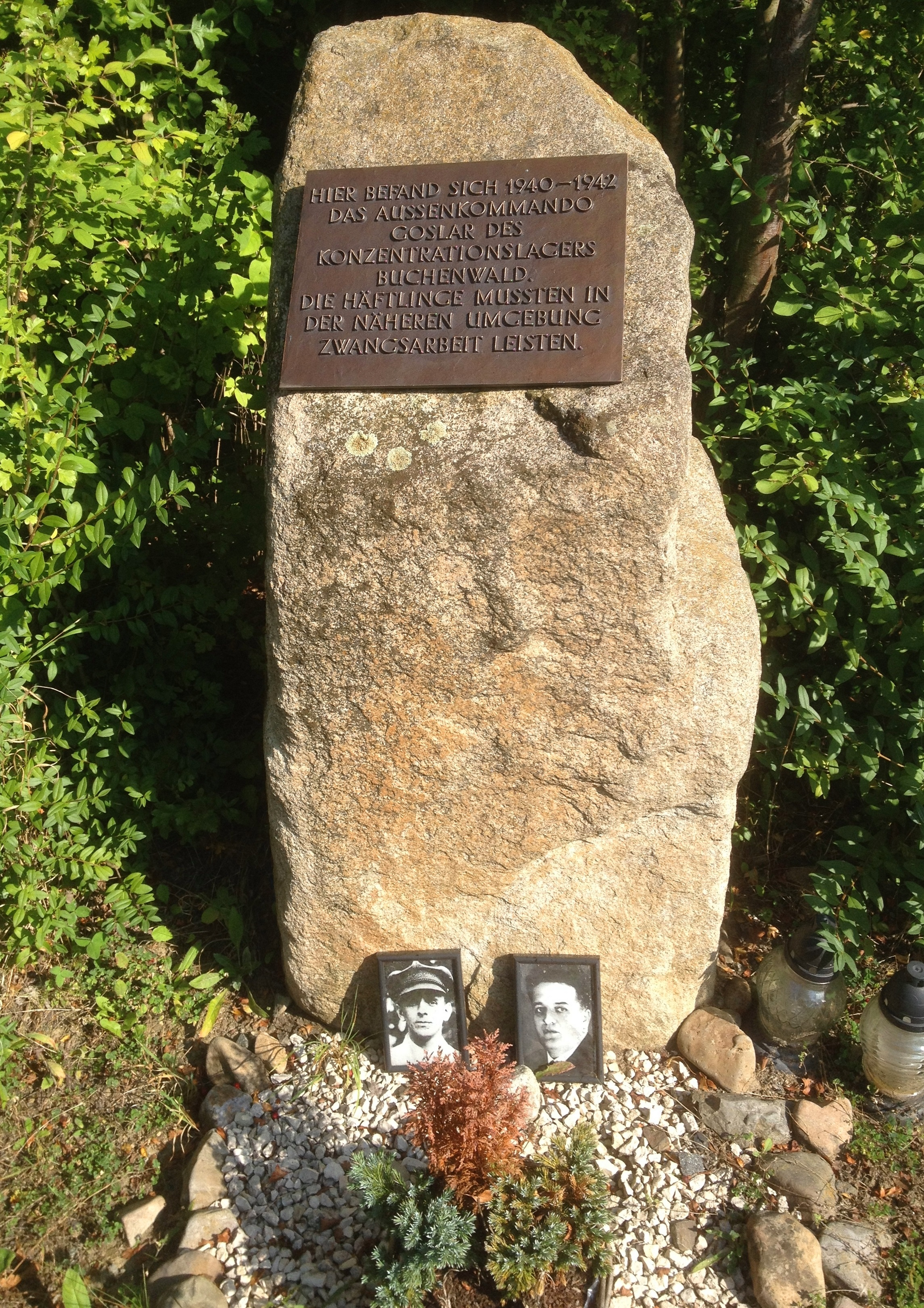
Memorial stone in Goslar.

Kraemer's activity in the camp infirmary led, in 1945 to the nickname "doctor of Buchenwald". The journalist and political scientist Eugen Kogon (CDU) praised his Buchenwald inmate in 1946's "The SS State" as a "strong, bold personality." The East German writer and fellow inmate Bruno Apitz included him in "Naked Among Wolves" (1956, film 1963) by giving the main character the name of Walter Krämer. In particular, the youth of East Germany (GDR) knew of Krämer because Apitz's novel was required reading in schools. At the Martin Luther University Halle, doctorate Christine Wenzel wrote a dissertation on "The Life and Work of the German Communist Walter Krämer". In Weimar and in Neukirchen, two medical schools were named after Kraemer in 1970, but in 1992/93 the names were changed. Relics from Kraemer's private and political life, which were displayed and preserved in the Weimar "Traditional Cabinet Walter Kraemer" (1975ff.), were then also removed and partially destroyed, while some other relics could be saved by the NS-memorial Aktives Museum Südwestfalen of his hometown. A dental clinic in Berlin-Lichtenberg was named after Kraemer.

In 1999, Kraemer was posthumously awarded the title Righteous Among the Nations by the Israeli Holocaust memorial museum Yad Vashem. The award ceremony in Siegen by the Israeli ambassador on 11 April 2000, the 55th anniversary of the liberation of the Buchenwald concentration camp, was attended by over 400 people.

In West Germany, Kraemer was largely unknown outside his region of origin, where his biography was controversially received and he remained without honor for a long time. On what would have been his 110th birthday in 2002, a memorial stone was erected in Goslar Hahndorf on the initiative of the association "Spurensuche Harzregion" (Harz Region Traces) for the former concentration camp subcamp, in which Kraemer was murdered. On 25 April 2011, the 66th anniversary of the liberation by the United States Army, the camp community of the concentration camp Buchenwald-Dora honored him with a plaque. It was the first award for a German. It was attended by groups of the Association of Persecutees of the Nazi Regime – Federation of Antifascists (VVN-BdA) and the DKP from the Siegerland. Among those speaking were Karl Prümm, a media scientist who was temporarily active in Siegen, and Romani Rose, Chairman of the Central Council of German Sinti and Roma. In Hanover, on 4 December 2012, Gunter Demnig placed a Stolperstein for Kraemer in front of the entrance to Lehmann's bookstore at Heiligerstraße 16, marking the site where the party office of the KPD had been, in which Kraemer had worked as a district manager. The Stolperstein was donated by the VVN-BdA Siegerland-Wittgenstein.

== Commemoration ==
Since the end of Nazism, an annual wreath-laying ceremony on the second Sunday in September, the "Day of the Victims of Fascism", is held at Kraemer's grave in Siegen.

As early as 1946, the Communist Party (KPD) demanded, in the context of several street renamings, that a street in Siegen be named after Walter Kraemer, but the appeals were ignored. After a majority of the council wished to name a street in Siegen after the Nazi Mayor Alfred Fissmer in 1947 — which the British military government forbade — the KPD proposed Walter Kraemer for the name. The request from the KPD was rejected by the CDU, SPD and FDP. In the political climate of the Cold War, the Communist Party had little influence in Siegen, unlike in the neighboring district of Altenkirchen, where a convalescent home was named after Kraemer in 1948.

With the ban on the KPD in the West in 1956 all efforts to rehabilitate Kraemer effectively ended for the time being. In 1975, the Jewish chairman of the Society for Christian-Jewish Cooperation, Hugo Herrmann, publicly referred to Kraemer, who, he said, had tried in Buchenwald to "put an end to the torture of the Jews", an effort for which he paid with his life. But this remained a lone voice. In November 1979, the VVN submitted a motion to the city's cultural committee to rename the street named after the anti-Semite Adolf Stoecker after Kraemer. The motion was supported only by the German Communist Party (DKP) and garnered minimal public response. The motion was rejected after months of waiting.

New initiatives in remembrance took place since the mid-1980s, but were met with unanimous rejection by politics and administration. Unions and SPD — traditional custodians of labor movement history — remained quiet. The naming of streets, squares, schools or hospitals after Nazis, on the other hand, continued. There was a wave of such new street namings in the 1960s and 1970s, for example after Friedrich Flick, Lothar Irle, Jakob Henrich, Ernst Bach, Bernhard Weiss and others. This was, up to the 1980s, not considered problematic and each of the broad political majorities vehemently defended these actions against strong criticism.

The Siegen literary scholar Karl Prümm and Klaus Dietermann of the Society for Christian-Jewish Cooperation put forward a proposal to publish a biography of Kraemer in 1986. Violent opposition to the publication was led by the local CDU politician Paul Tigges (Lennestadt) founder and board member of the Christine Koch company . In 1985 requested the DKP, to set up a reminder and memorial for Walter Kraemer, the Council and administration did not respond. In 1991 the Society for Christian-Jewish Cooperation organised a "Walter Kraemer week". A proposal in 1997 to designate a central plaza in Siegen to Kraemer, was supported by only a minority once again in the city council. In 1998, the city council decided to honour Kraemer with a plaque at his birthplace - off the city centre in a residential area. It was dedicated on 27 January 1999, the day of commemoration of the victims of Nazism. In 2007 there was a failed citizens request for "change of historically-loaded and dubious street names", e.g. the renaming of Adolf Stoecker street to Walter Kraemer street, the urban main committee refused the request. The designation proposals extended now to a road, a central bridge and a hospital but they were unsuccessful. On 24 May 2011 a request from the Council fractions of Greens, Left and SPD (To rename a bridge) was rejected by a majority. The ensuing public debate lead to historians such as Ulrich Opfermann being critical of the CDU's attitude as "having little historical consciousness". Opfermann explained that the "roots" of the CDU lay "in the anti-democratic and anti-Semitic DNVP" referring to the Siegen CDU politicians and contemporary of Krämer - Ernst Bach, who had a street named after him by the council in spite of his extreme right-wing past and corruption. On the 70th anniversary the society for Christian-Jewish cooperation and Siegen Nazi memorial "Active Museum Südwestfalen " organised a Walter Kraemer Memorial week. The regional VVN BdA together with the camp community Buchenwald-Dora organised a symposium on Kraemer. In 2012 the city council finally agreed by majority that the square in front of the main entrance of the district hospital in the district of Weidenau was to be named Walter Kraemer Square.

In November 2014, the Walter Kraemer Square was completed in Siegen District Hospital. It was designed by architect Erwin Wortelkamp. Several design elements can be seen to symbolize the life and work of Walter Kramer. A plaque bearing Kraemer's picture, along with saying of the French Jewish philosopher Emmanuel Levinas on the floor directs the visitors in the hospital: ". The concern for others prevails over the care of the self" At the opening ceremony December 2014, said district administrator Andreas Müller (SPD) of a "dignified event and a momentous day for victories", to which it had been "a long way" since Kraemer have one of the "under wanted Nazi victims". Mayor Steffen Mues (CDU) declared, Kraemer showed exemplary humanitarian commitment and the resistance against the Nazi regime was more important than the criticism. He recalled the District Administrator Paul Breuer (CDU) and its active commitment to the designation of the place. This was "bold, groundbreaking - in short: right". Have been [42] The Kraemer biographer and head of Nazi memorial Klaus Dietermann looks to Breuer and Mues as important supporters of Kraemer assessment.
