= Victor Stern =

Austrian politician (1885–1958)

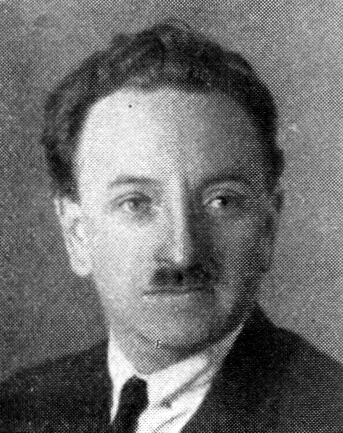
- Born: 29 October 1885; Třešť, Austria-Hungary
- Died: 27 March 1958 (aged 72); Potsdam-Babelsberg, East Germany
- Years active: 1914-1955

Victor Stern (29 October 1885 – 27 March 1958) was an Austrian philosopher, teacher and communist politician. He was active in communist parties in Austria and Germany until 1923 when he was forced to exile. He settled first in Czechoslovakia and then in the Soviet Union. From 1946 he lived in East Germany where he stayed until his death.

== Early life and education ==
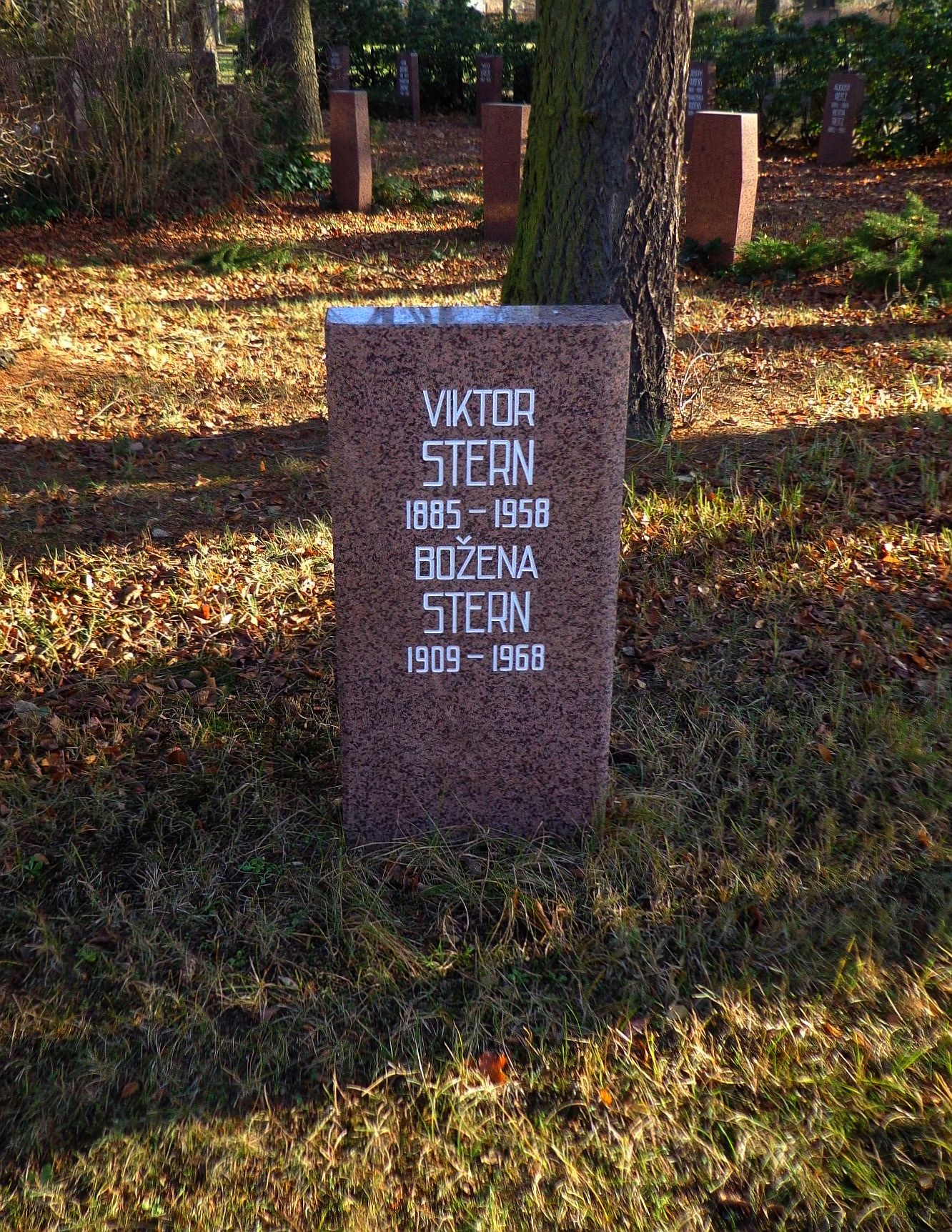
Stern's grave in the Friedrichsfelde Central Cemetery, Berlin

Stern was born in Třešť, Bohemia, Austria-Hungary, on 29 October 1885. His father was a rabbi in the Jewish community. Between 1904 and 1908 he studied philosophy in Vienna and obtained a PhD.

== Career and activities ==
Following his graduation Stern taught mathematics, physics, logic and psychology at a private school. He joined the Austrian Social Democratic Party in 1904. He became a member of the Independent Social Democratic Party in Germany in 1919 and a member of the German Communist Party in 1920. He served as a military leader of the Ruhr Red Army alongside Wilhelm Zaisser. From 1921 to 1923 he acted as the leader of communists in Austria. He was the editor-in-chief of a journal entitled Die Rote Fahne in Vienna for one year between 1921 and 1922. During this period he represented the Austrian communists at the fourth Comintern meeting held in 1922.

Stern was made political editor of the German communist journal Volksblatt in 1923 when its three editors were dismissed due to their opposition to the affiliation with the Comintern. However, Stern was extradited from Germany immediately following his appointment. He exiled into Czechoslovakia where he lived until 1935. Then he settled in the Soviet Union where he worked as a teacher at the Lenin School in the period 1935–1945. In the mid-1930s he also taught at the Comintern schools. Stern returned to Czechoslovakia and then, settled in East Germany where he joined the ruling party, Socialist Unity Party. In 1947 Stern was appointed to the Advanced Training Institute for Functionaries 'Karl Marx'. In 1952 he was promoted to the professorship.

== Later years and death ==
Stern retired in 1955 as a result of his long-term illness. He died in Potsdam-Babelsberg on 27 March 1958.

=== Awards ===
Stern was the recipient of the Soviet Order of the Red Star which was awarded to him before he left the Soviet Union in 1945.
