= Ruhr Red Army =

German workers' army behind the 1920 Ruhr uprising

- German: Rote Ruhrarmee
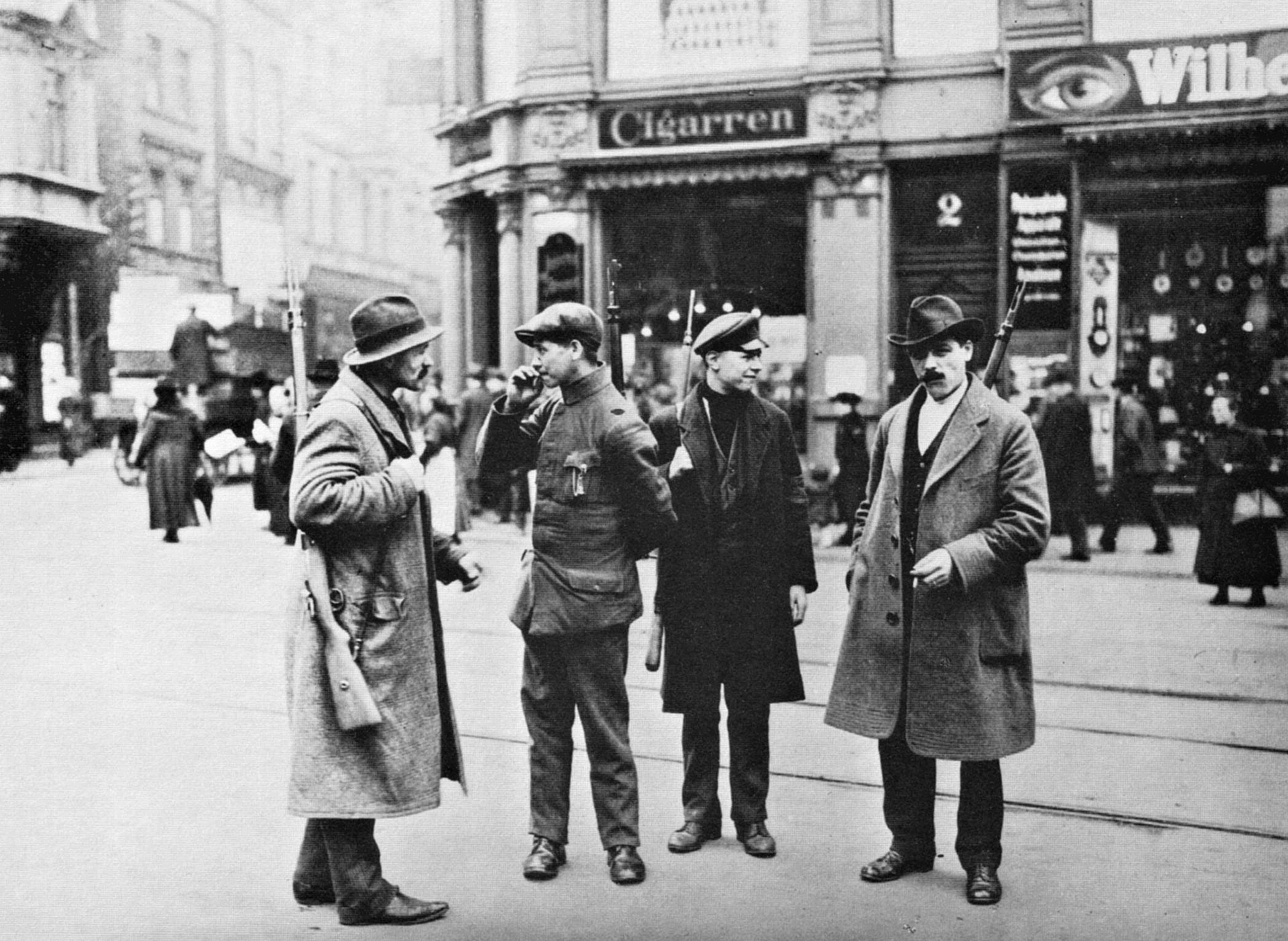
- Members of the Ruhr Red Army in Dortmund, 1920
- Dates active: 13 March – 6 April 1920
- Active regions: Ruhr Valley
- Ideology: Communism; Socialism; Anarchism
- Political position: Left-wing
- Size: 50,000 – 80,000
- Wars: Ruhr uprising

The Ruhr Red Army or Red Ruhr Army (German: Rote Ruhrarmee) was a paramilitary of 50,000 to 80,000 left-wing workers that fought in the Ruhr uprising in Weimar Germany from 13 March to 6 April 1920.

The Ruhr Red Army was formed in Germany's Ruhr region in reaction to the right-wing Kapp Putsch from left-wing militias that supported the establishment of a council republic. It came into conflict with the German government in Berlin after an agreement to end a general strike in the region failed. Reichswehr and Freikorps units put down the rebellion with considerable brutality, including summary executions of prisoners and the killing of wounded fighters. The Ruhr Red Army was defeated by 6 April and many surviving members fled to the French-occupied Rhineland.

== Formation ==
On 13 March 1920, the Kapp Putsch was launched by right-wing elements to overthrow the elected government of the Weimar Republic. The majority of Germany's left-of-centre political parties and trade unions responded with a call for a nationwide general strike. It drew around 12 million workers and was largely responsible for the quick failure of the attempted coup by 18 March. Chancellor Gustav Bauer of the centre-left Social Democratic Party (SPD), the largest party of the ruling Weimar Coalition, called off the strike. A schism between the centre-left and far-left parties soon became apparent. In the Ruhr, a heavily industrialised region in western Germany, many far-left workers and union officials did not stop with the strike once the Kapp Putsch failed. They spontaneously formed executive councils (Vollzugsräte) that took power over local governments after disarming the local Security Police and Reichswehr forces. By 22 March, the entire Ruhr district was in their effective control. The executive councils would utilise local workers' defence (Arbeiterwehr) which armed themselves with weapons from Citizens' Defense (Einwohnerwehr) groups. It was from these workers' defence groups that the Red Ruhr Army was soon formed. On 15 March, the government sent the Freikorps Lichtschlag to suppress the uprising but, despite being better armed, were greatly outnumbered and defeated two days later. Their weapons, including artillery pieces, and 600 members were captured.

At its peak, the Red Ruhr Army's strength is estimated to have been 50,000 to 80,000 members, mostly striking workers with ties to far-left organisations. Of those who belonged to union-based organizations, a narrow majority came from the free unions and the remainder from the anarcho-syndicalist Free Workers' Union of Germany (FAUD). Among members of political parties, 60% were members of the Communist Party of Germany (KPD), 30% from the Independent Social Democratic Party (USPD) and only 10% from the SPD.

== Armed rebellion ==
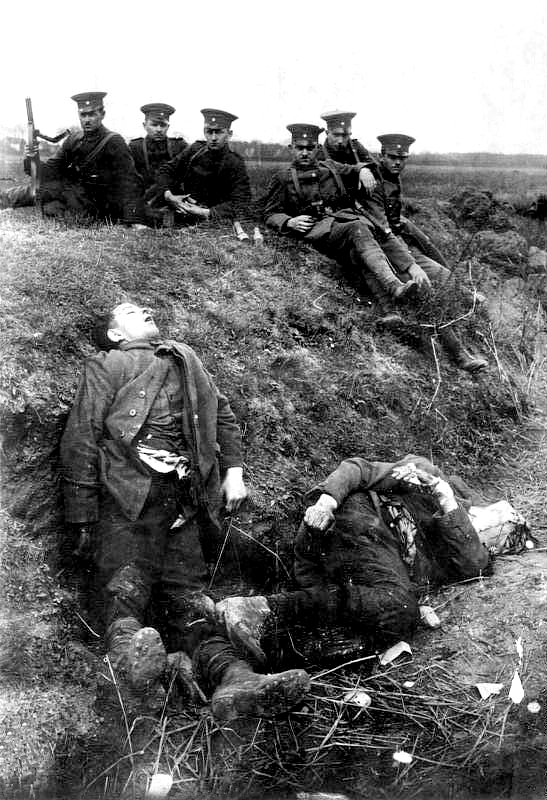
Members of the Reichswehr sitting above the bodies of Red Ruhr Army fighters who had been shot, 2 April 1920, at Möllen near Duisburg

On 24 March, local and national government authorities signed the Bielefeld Agreement with the more moderate political parties and executive councils. The agreement called for the Red Ruhr Army to hand over its weapons, with a promise of amnesty for those who had broken the law in defence of the government against the Kapp Putsch. Leaders of the Red Ruhr Army, however, thought that it would be better to fight against the government than accept the compromises in the agreement. At a meeting a week later, on 1 April, the leaders of the Red Ruhr Army agreed that there was no point in continuing the fight, but it had by then splintered into numerous, largely independent groups over which the leaders had no control. In addition, urgent calls for help were coming in from local citizens and city administrations reporting that Red Ruhr Army members were engaging in extortion, looting and shootings.

On 2 April, the government sent in both Reichswehr and Freikorps troops, who were experienced and heavily armed, into the Ruhr. The uprising was quickly crushed with mass arrests and shootings without it always being clear whether the victims were members of the Red Ruhr Army or not. Wounded fighters were shot, as were ten female medics with the Red Ruhr Army who were carrying pistols. Many fighters were reported as having been shot while fleeing, indicating that they were shot in the back. Around 50 had been summarily executed and an additional 205 condemned by drumhead courts before the government in Berlin forbade them on 3 April. General Oskar von Watter, who was in charge of government troops in the Ruhr, defended himself from other charges that his men had engaged in unlawful behaviour by citing a letter from the Ministry of the Reichswehr that stated, "You are given complete freedom to do what the situation demands".

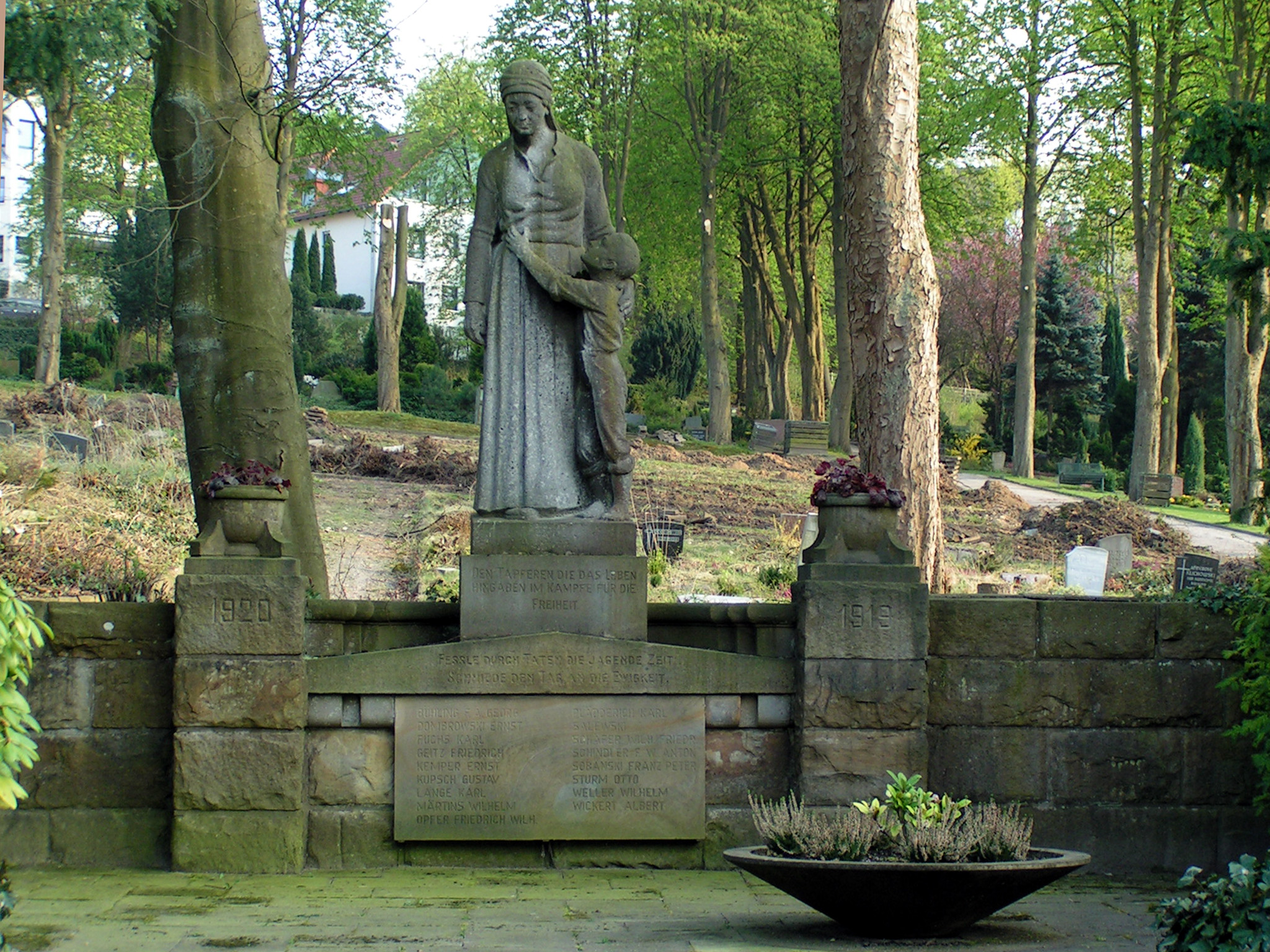
Memorial to the Ruhr uprising in Hagen

On 5 April, a large part of the surviving Red Ruhr Army fled to the French occupied zone of the Rhineland. The skirmish that took place in Gelsenkirchen the next day marked the final end of the uprising and of the Red Ruhr Army. The number of insurgents killed has never been accurately determined. Historian Heinrich August Winkler puts the number at "well over 1,000", the majority of them killed after being captured. The Reichswehr lost 208 killed and 123 missing; the Security Police 41 dead. The number of Freikorps deaths has been put at 273.

== Members ==
- Ernst Lohagen, military leader
- Victor Stern, military leader
- Wilhelm Zaisser, military leader
- Artur König, political leader
- Bernhard Menne, political leader
- Walter Oettinghaus, political leader
- Alfred Schröer, political leader
- Hans Marchwitza, platoon leader
- Walter Kraemer, section leader
- Walter Vesper, machine gun detachment leader
- Heinrich Fomferra, soldier
- Erich Glückauf, soldier
- Gottfried Grünberg, soldier
- Wilhelm Pieck, political advisor

== See also ==
- History of the Ruhr District
