= Manfred Uschner =

East German diplomat and party functionary (1937–2007)

- Uschner c. 2002

Deputy Department Head of the Central Committee
- In office 21 June 1974 – 23 February 1989

Instructor for Latin America in the International Relations Department
- In office 1 September 1968 – 21 June 1974
- Head: Paul Markowski

Personal details
- Born: 16 May 1937 Magdeburg, Province of Saxony, Free State of Prussia, Nazi Germany (now Saxony-Anhalt, Germany)
- Died: 13 November 2007 (aged 70) Berlin, Germany
- Resting place: Evangelischer Kirchhof Altglienicke
- Party: Socialist Unity Party
- Other political affiliations: Social Democratic Party (1995–2007)
- Education: Deutsche Akademie für Staats- und Rechtswissenschaften „Walter Ulbricht“ (Dr. rer. pol.); "Karl Marx" Party Academy
- Occupation: Party Functionary; Author; Diplomat
- Awards: Banner of Labor, 1st class; Patriotic Order of Merit, 1st class

Manfred Uschner (16 May 1937 – 13 November 2007) was an East German diplomat and party functionary of the Socialist Unity Party (SED).

Born to a family with a long-standing social democratic tradition, Uschner joined the SED and worked as a diplomat and lecturer in East Germany. He thereafter served as an employee in the apparatus of the Central Committee of the SED for over twenty years, including fifteen years as personal assistant to Hermann Axen, Politburo member and Secretary of the Central Committee responsible for foreign affairs.

In the 1980s, Uschner held close contacts with many politicians of the West German SPD. On the orders of Erich Honecker, he was purged from the Central Committee apparatus on the eve of the Peaceful Revolution for this and for being critical of the SED's leadership. He finally joined the SPD in reunified Germany, also publishing books critical of the SED.

== Life and career ==
=== Early life ===
Manfred Uschner was born on 16 May 1937 in Magdeburg to a working-class family. He lost his sister and grandmother during the air raid on Magdeburg on 16 January 1945.

Uschner's family had a long social democratic tradition. His grandfather Paul Uschner was a bodyguard to August Bebel, founding father of the SPD. Uschner's father Fritz rejoined the SPD after the war and cofounded the Socialist Unity Party (SED) in Magdeburg. Fritz Uschner rose to become a candidate member of the Central Committee of the SED and a member of the Volkskammer in 1950, but was purged by the party in 1953 and only rehabilitated in 1956.

Uschner joined the children's association of the Free German Youth (FDJ) in 1947 and became a member of the Ernst Thälmann Pioneer Organisation upon its founding in 1948.

After completing his Abitur, Uschner became one of the first students of the Institute for International Relations of the German Academy of Political Science and Law "Walter Ulbricht" in Potsdam-Babelsberg, de facto a Marxist–Leninist cadre factory of the ruling SED, graduating in 1959. On 2 December 1959, Uschner joined the East German Ministry for Foreign Affairs. Not even two years later, on 19 January 1961, he became an attaché of the East German embassy in Budapest. This appointment was short-lived, as he was soon transferred back to the Institute for International Relations as a lecturer, where he also received a doctorate (Dr. rer. pol.), his December 1967 dissertation discussing relations between Brazil and West Germany.

=== SED Central Committee ===
Against his wishes and despite not being an expert on Latin America, Uschner was poached by the SED, joining the Central Committee apparatus as instructor for Latin America in the International Relations Department on 1 September 1968. From 1972 to 1973, he was forced to attend a one-year course at the "Karl Marx" Party Academy. Upon his graduation, Stalinist principal Hanna Wolf initially wanted to expel Uschner from the SED for perceived oppositional attitudes.

On 15 August 1974, Uschner was promoted to be the second, scientific personal assistant to Hermann Axen, Politburo member and Secretary of the Central Committee responsible for foreign affairs, with the rank of a deputy Central Committee department head. He succeeded Herbert Barth, who was transferred back to the Ministry of Foreign Affairs. Axen had previously been responsible for "bringing in line" his father's Magdeburg SED in the early 1950s. Starting in 1976, Uschner also served as secretary of the Foreign Policy Commission at the Politburo. In 1983, he rose to first personal assistant.

From 1984, Uschner was a member of the Joint Security Policy Working Group SED-SPD, which mainly worked on disarmament, serving as chief of staff for the SED side.

Uschner analyzed foreign press for Axen, also accompanying him on foreign trips, most notably to the US in May 1988, where Uschner held discussions with Robert McNamara. Uschner had increasingly good contacts with politicians of the SPD, in particular Egon Bahr, whom he befriended. Unusually for a personal assistant to a Central Committee Secretary, Uschner was allowed to continue to publish, give speeches and appear on TV, including in West Germany.

Uschner received several state awards during his time in the Central Committee apparatus, ultimately receiving the Patriotic Order of Merit in gold in May 1987.

=== Downfall ===
After being warned repeatedly, Uschner was fired by Hermann Axen on the orders of Erich Honecker on 20 February 1989, the Central Committee Secretariat formally removing him two days later. He was accused of "social democratism" and of holding an "anti-party stance". A Stasi dossier claimed him of having "succumb to enemy influence (SPD)".

Honecker had originally called Axen two days earlier with the plan to have him be arrested by the Stasi and imprisoned in their Berlin-Hohenschönhausen political prison, but Axen was able to talk him out of that, arguing it would disrupt the talks with the SPD. Similar to the removal of Herbert Häber, Uschner was transferred to the Institute for Marxist–Leninist Philosophy of the Academy for Social Sciences at the Central Committee of the SED with a 50% pay cut and under constant surveillance of the Stasi.

Uschner's removal came as part of a broader wave of about 20,000 party functionaries, including 39 other Central Committee employees, removed from office and 66,000 party members expelled for being critical of the SED's leadership from January to November 1989.

Until the Peaceful Revolution, Uschner successfully managed to contact SPD Bundestag member Karsten Voigt. A few days after he received an invitation from the American embassy arranged by Voigt, Uschner's Wartburg car burned down in front of his son's kindergarten. The responsible Stasi Main Directorate for Reconnaissance had originally planned for the car to explode in the garage, killing Uschner's son above to make sure "Uschner no longer engages in politics after that!".

=== Reunified Germany ===
Shortly after his February 1990 rehabilitation, Uschner left the now-renamed Party of Democratic Socialism (PDS). He formed the Bernstein-Kautsky-Kreis (named after German socialists Eduard Bernstein and Karl Kautsky) with other social democratic-minded former SED members, who felt that they are being pushed out of the PDS. He was employed as managing director of the Bernstein-Kautsky-Kreis, which already had 450 members by 1991, as part of an employment subsidy scheme, also publishing various articles and books, including on the SED and the Ostpolitik. Uschner was also invited by the SPD to speak at the Bundestag's public inquiry on the reappraisal of the SED dictatorship.

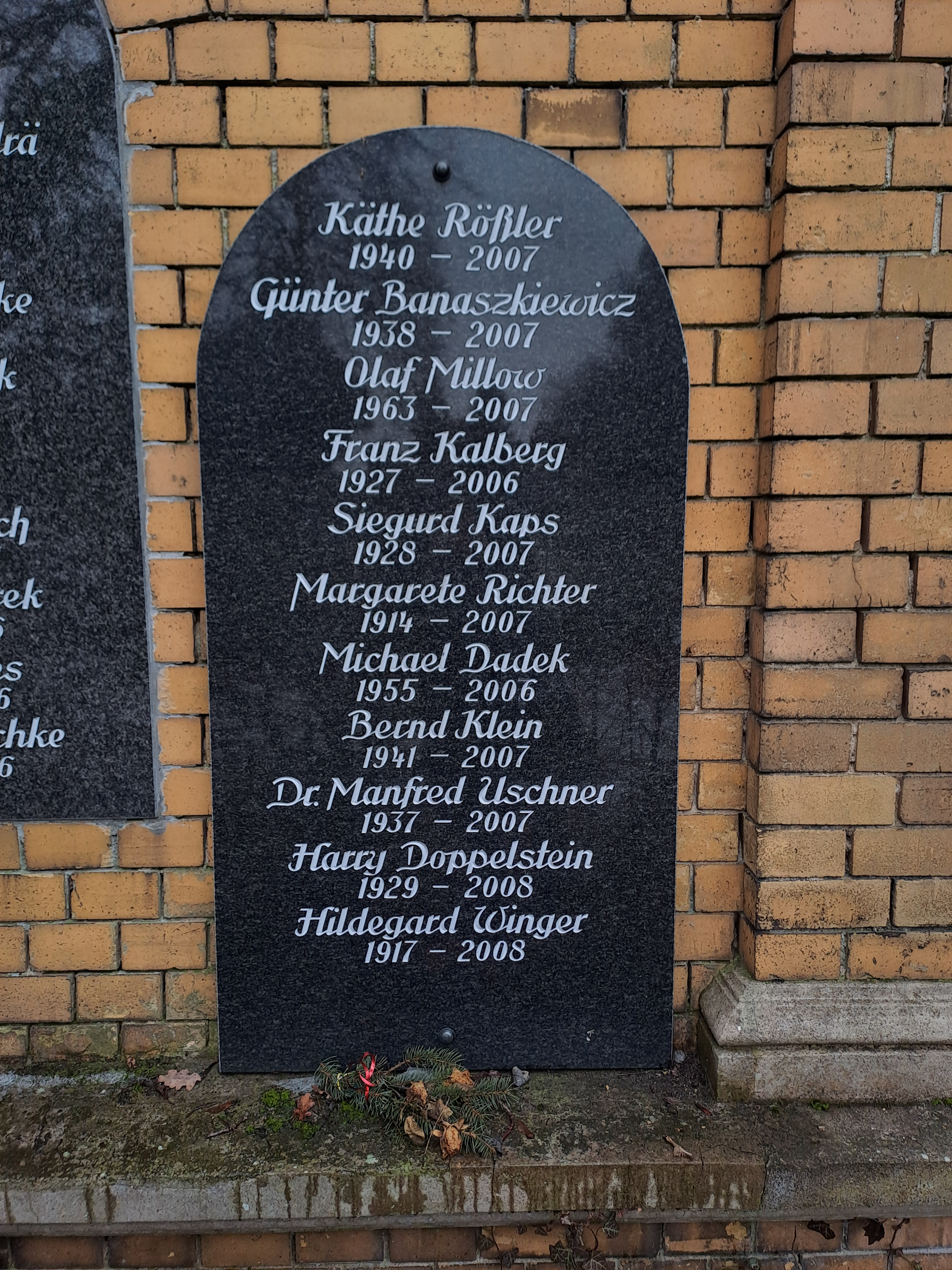
Uschner's grave in 2026

In the 1990s, Uschner also repeatedly attempted to join the SPD. He was initially rejected in 1993 by his local SPD branch in Treptow for being a former SED functionary. His attempt to join the SPD in 1995 via the neighbouring Kreuzberg SPD in former West Berlin caused controversy and a discussion on how to deal with former SED members, despite Uschner's membership application having the endorsement of Willy Brandt and his friend Egon Bahr. He was eventually accepted into the SPD via the Kreuzberg branch later that year. Some party members blamed the SPD's loss in the 1995 Berlin state election on Uschner despite lead candidate Ingrid Stahmer having publicly opposed Uschner's membership application.

In spite of his own political persecution by the SED and the Stasi, Uschner became critical of the reappraisal done in reunified Germany and the Bundestag's public inquiry in particular by the mid-1990s, among other things arguing against using the term Unrechtsstaat for East Germany, publishing the names of former Stasi collaborators and the "discrimination" of former SED members. Uschner faced criticism for offering disgraced former East German SPD leader Ibrahim Böhme, who was revealed to have worked with the Stasi, a job at the Bernstein-Kautsky-Kreis.

Manfred Uschner died on 13 November 2007 in Berlin at the age of 70. He was buried in a communal urn plot in the Altglienicke cemetery.

== Bibliography ==
- Die Beziehungen der westdeutschen Bundesrepublik zu Brasilien (1967).
- Entwicklungspolitik, Expansion, Globalstrategie (1969).
- Lateinamerika – Schauplatz revolutionärer Kämpfe (1975).
- Die Ostpolitik der SPD (1991).
- Die zweite Etage (1993).
- Die roten Socken (1995).
