= Voerde =

- Town
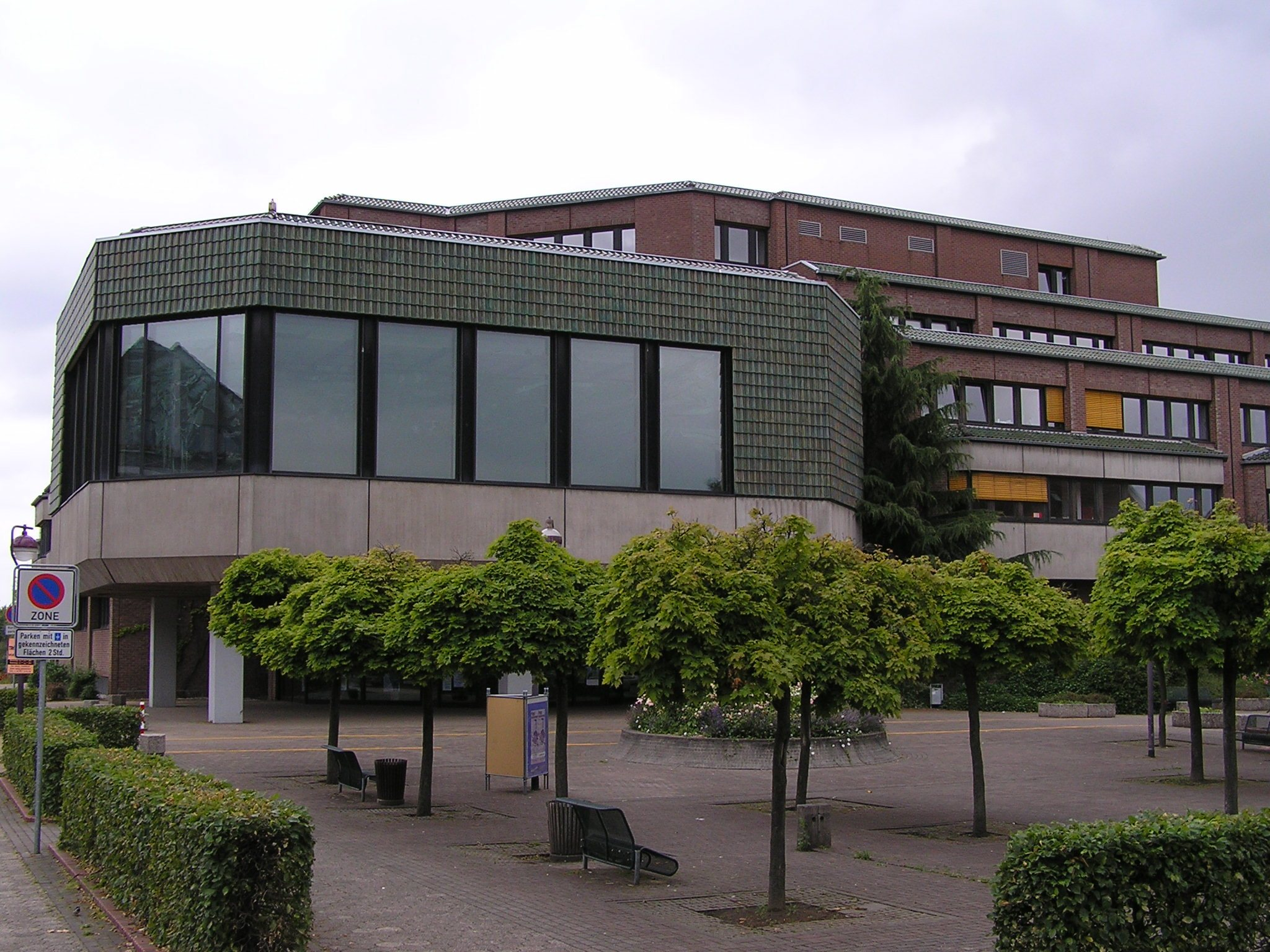
- Town hall

- Coat of arms

- Location of Voerde within Wesel district
- Interactive map of Voerde
- Location within Germany Location within North Rhine-Westphalia
- Coordinates: 51°36′00″N 06°41′0″E
- Country: Germany
- State: North Rhine-Westphalia
- Admin. region: Düsseldorf
- District: Wesel

Government
  - Mayor (2020–25): Dirk Haarmann (SPD)

Area
  - Total: 53.49 km^{2} (20.65 sq mi)
- Elevation: 26 m (85 ft)

Population (2025-12-31)
  - Total: 35,529
  - Density: 664.2/km^{2} (1,720/sq mi)
- Time zone: UTC+01:00 (CET)
  - Summer (DST): UTC+02:00 (CEST)
- Postal codes: 46562
- Dialling codes: 02855, 0281 (Friedrichsfeld)
- Vehicle registration: WES
- Website: www.voerde.de

Voerde (German: ˈføːɐ̯də, romanized: -, lit. 'De-Voerde.ogg') is a town in the district of Wesel, in North Rhine-Westphalia, Germany. It is situated on the right bank of the Rhine, approximately 10 kilometres (6.2 mi) south-east of Wesel, and 20 km north of Duisburg.

== City structure ==
According to art. 1(3) of the Main Charter of the town, the municipal area is divided into the 11 quarters of Götterswickerhamm, Löhnen, Mehrum, Möllen, Voerde, Stockum, Holthausen, Friedrichsfeld, Emmelsum, Spellen and Ork. These quarters are, however, not localities in the sense of article 39 of the North Rhine-Westphalian Municipal Code (GO NW).

== History ==
Voerde owes its name to a ford crossing of a branch of the River Rhine, which existed there during Roman and Frankish times (the old spelling for Furt was Fuerdt). In 1244, the town was mentioned in records for the first time as a fiefdom and castle of the abbey of Werden. In 1804, during the time of the French occupation, Voerde was integrated into the Amt Götterswickerhamm, which was renamed to Voerde in 1911. During World War II, the 9th US-Army crossed the Rhine in the night of 23 to 24 March 1945 in the area of Voerde and reached the right Rhine-bank for the first time (Operation Plunder). Since 1975 Voerde is part of the district of Wesel.

== Population ==
Historical population

Year	Pop.	±% p.a.
1965	25,241	—
1970	27,398	+1.65%
1975	31,128	+2.59%
1980	31,589	+0.29%
1985	33,024	+0.89%
1990	36,415	+1.97%
1995	38,269	+1.00%

Year	Pop.	±% p.a.
2000	38,979	+0.37%
2005	38,580	−0.21%
2010	37,406	−0.62%
2015	36,675	−0.39%
2020	36,047	−0.34%
2025	35,529	−0.29%

Source: Landesdatabank Nordrhein-Westfalen

== Buildings and constructions ==
- Pylons of Voerde
- Haus Voerde: Moated castle
- Haus Wohnung: Moated castle

== Politics ==
At the last communal-election in Voerde the SPD became the strongest party. The incumbent mayor is Dirk Haarmann (SPD).

== Twin towns – sister cities ==
Voerde is twinned with:

- Alnwick, England, United Kingdom
- Handlová, Slovakia

== Transport ==
Voerde Main Station is located in the town centre at the railway track Oberhausen-Arnhem. A second station, Voerde-Friedrichsfeld, is located 4 km northern. Important waterways, the Rhine and the Wesel-Datteln-channel, cross Voerde's area.

== Sports ==
There are 11 shooting clubs, 2 Tennis clubs and a riding club in Voerde. The most important sport club is the TV Voerde.

== Education ==
There are 7 elementary schools, one gymnasium, one comprehensive school, one secondary school and one school for mentally handicapped pupils.

== Notable people ==
- Karl Topp (1895–1981), naval officer in World Wars I and II
- Heike Schulte-Mattler (born 1958), athlete, Olympic medalist
