= Freikorps Lichtschlag =

- Active: 14 December 1918–2 April 1920
- Country: Germany
- Type: Freikorps
- Size: 2,500 men
- Nickname: "Freikorps Totschlag"
- Engagements: German revolution of 1918–1919: Spartacist uprising; Kapp Putsch; Ruhr uprising

Commanders
- Notable commanders: Captain Otto Lichtschlag

The Freikorps Lichtschlag was a paramilitary unit in Germany that was established on 14 December 1918, just after the end of World War I.

== History ==
After the German revolution of 1918–1919, the general command of the VI. Armeekorps based in Münster under General Oskar von Watter began to establish Freikorps units out of troops returning from the Western Front. Thus the Freikorps Lichtschlag was created in the area around Hagen with a strength of about 2,500 men. It was under the command of Captain Otto Lichtschlag (1885–1961). The Freikorps were to be temporary formations, serving to give ex-soldiers a purpose post-war.

On February 14, the force was sent to Dorsten to act against Spartacist uprisings in the town. The next day, they engaged the Spartacists in a firefight. Fighting was fierce, especially in Hervest-Dorsten and Holsterhausen, where the Spartacists were entrenched. Artillery and poison gas were used to take control. The Freikorps Lichtschlag earned the nickname "Freikorps Totschlag" for their brutality. After capturing Hervest, they launched mass arrests based on a discovered membership list, executing several locals. Thirty-eight workers were killed in the fighting, and 110 Spartacists were imprisoned in Dorsten. Five Freikorps Lichtschlag fighters were also killed.

Subsequently the supporters of the Communist Party (KPD) and the Independent Social Democratic Party (USPD) declared a general strike in the Ruhr area. This was suppressed, however. Subsequently, the situation remained tense and was further heated up through the actions of the Freikorps. On 15 April 1919, soldiers of the Freikorps Lichtschlag shot into a gathering of striking workers in the district of Mettmann, resulting in some deaths and injuries.

It was used to form the Reichswehr-Brigade 31 in June 1919.

During the Kapp Putsch, the unit supported the putschists instead of the Weimar Republic. The unit was against the workers who refused to call off their general strike after the end of the Putsch. In March 1920 the unit marched into Wetter, in order to enter the Ruhr area from the east. On 16 March its advance was stopped near Aplerbeck by 10,000 men of the Ruhr Red Army. One day later, the Freikorps Lichtschlag were defeated by the Ruhr Red Army, who went on to occupy Dortmund. The defeated troops fled to Aplerbeck and Hörde, where they were intercepted and destroyed. The worker's army seized many weapons. The Freikorps Lichtschlag were almost completely annihilated. On 22 March, the entire Ruhr region was controlled by the Ruhr Red Army but by 2 April, the Reichswehr had recaptured the region.
