= Wilhelm Zaisser =

German politician (1893–1958)

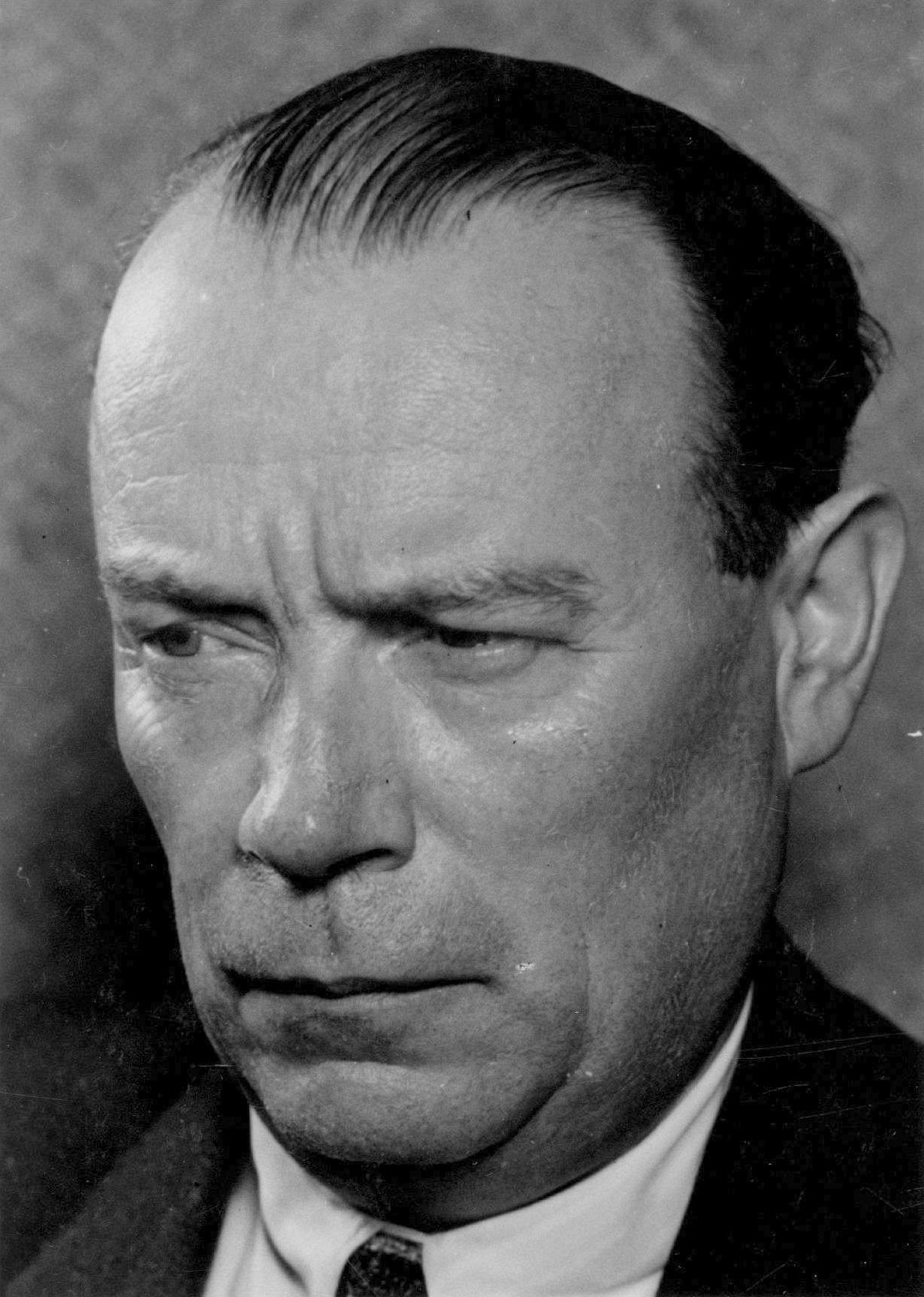
- Zaisser in 1947

Minister of State Security
- In office 8 February 1950 – 18 July 1953
- Minister-President: Otto Grotewohl
- First Deputy: Erich Mielke
- Preceded by: Position established
- Succeeded by: Ernst Wollweber

Member of the Volkskammer
- In office 8 November 1950 – 17 February 1954
- Preceded by: Position established
- Succeeded by: Margarete Buder

Personal details
- Born: 20 June 1893 Gelsenkirchen, Province of Westphalia, Kingdom of Prussia, German Empire (now North Rhine-Westphalia, Germany)
- Died: 3 March 1958 (aged 64) East Berlin, East Germany
- Party: USPD (1918–1919); KPD (1919–1932); CPSU (1932–1947); SED (1947–1954)
- Spouse: Elisabeth Knipp (m. 1922)
- Children: Renate Böttcher-Zaisser (born 22 April 1924)
- Occupation: Soldier; Spy; Politician

Military service
- Allegiance: German Empire; Revolutionaries; Republic of the Rif; Revolutionaries; Canton Soviet; Czechoslovakia; Spanish Republic
- Branch/service: Imperial German Army; Ruhr Red Army; Riffian Army; Druze Revolutionaries; Red Guard; Czechoslovak Army; International Brigades
- Years of service: 1914–1918; 1920; 1925–1926; 1927–1930; 1930–1932; 1936–1938
- Rank: Brigadier General
- Commands: XIII International Brigade
- Battles/wars: World War I; Eastern Front; Ruhr Uprising; Guangzhou Uprising; Rif War; Great Syrian Revolt; Spanish Civil War
- Espionage activity
- Allegiance: Soviet Union
- Service branch: Main Intelligence Directorate
- Service years: 1924–1939
- Codename: "Gomez"
- Central institution membership: 1950–1953: Full member, Politburo of the Central Committee; 1950–1953: Full member, Central Committee; Other offices held: 1949–1950: Chief, Volkspolizei-Bereitschaft; 1949–1950: Vice President, German Administration of the Interior; 1948–1949: Deputy Minister-President, Saxony-Anhalt; 1948–1949: Minister, Ministry of the Interior of Saxony-Anhalt; 1947–1948: Chief, Saxony-Anhalt Police

Wilhelm Zaisser (20 June 1893 – 3 March 1958) was a German communist politician and statesman who served as the founder and first Minister for State Security of the German Democratic Republic (East Germany) from 1950 to 1953.

A veteran of World War I, the Ruhr Uprising, and the Spanish Civil War, he was recruited by the Soviet Union as a GRU agent and served in that capacity for most of the 1920s and 1930s. He returned to Germany after the end of World War II and took part in the founding of the Socialist Unity Party (SED) and the GDR. Following the death of Joseph Stalin and the East German uprising of 1953, he opposed SED First Secretary Walter Ulbricht but lost the power struggle and was stripped of his positions.

== Early life ==
Born in Gelsenkirchen, Westphalia in to the family of a gendarmerie sergeant, Zaisser studied to become a teacher from 1910 to 1913 in Essen. When World War I began a year later, Zaisser joined the Imperial German Army. Upon leaving the service in 1918, Zaisser joined the Independent Social Democratic Party of Germany (USPD) and in 1919 returned to Essen, where he became a school teacher. During this period, Zaisser became an active communist. During the Kapp Putsch in 1920, he was a military leader of the fledgling Red Ruhr Army, which led to his arrest and dismissal as a teacher in 1921. After his release, Zaisser worked for the Communist Party of Germany (KPD) as a propagandist. From 1921 to 1922, Zaisser edited the Ruhr Echo and the Bergischen Voice of the People. In 1923, Zaisser was recruited into the KPD's intelligence wing and worked to covertly subvert the Third French Republic's occupation of the Ruhr.

Zaisser's efficient work caused him to be summoned to Moscow a year later, where he received both political and military intelligence training by the GRU.

== Career in Soviet Intelligence ==
After returning to the Weimar Republic in 1924, Zaisser became one of the leaders of the KPD intelligence wing, reporting directly to the Central Committee. Throughout the 1920s, he was a paramilitary instructor and political leader for the KPD in such the areas of Rhine, Westphalia and Berlin. He also worked covertly in other nations for the GRU, acting as a military advisor to Syrian and Berber revolutionaries from 1925 to 1926. Starting in 1927, Zaisser worked almost exclusively for the Executive Committee of the Comintern, serving as a military advisor in China from 1927 to 1930 (co-organizing the Guangzhou Uprising alongside Heinz Neumann) and Czechoslovakia from 1930 to 1932. His covert activities were ultimately rewarded by full membership in the Communist Party of the Soviet Union in 1932 and full Soviet citizenship in 1940. In 1936, Zaisser traveled to the Second Spanish Republic under the covert identity of "Gomez."

On behalf of the Soviets, Zaisser became a military advisor to the Spanish Republican Army, while secretly remaining a, GRU agent, and as the Chief of the Servicio de Investigación Militar, the political police of the Second Spanish Republic. Wilhelm Zaisser's deputy was a career NKVD operative and future Stasi Minister Erich Mielke, who used the cover name "Fritz Leissner."

In addition to Zaisser and Mielke, the S.I.M. was filled with countless other agents of the GRU and NKVD, whose Spanish rezident was General Aleksandr Mikhailovich Orlov. According to author Donald Rayfield, "Stalin, Yezhov, and Beria distrusted Soviet participants in the Spanish war. Military advisors like Vladimir Antonov-Ovseenko, journalists like Koltsov were open to infection by the heresies, especially Trotsky's, prevalent among the Republic's supporters. NKVD agents sent to Spain were therefore keener on abducting and murdering anti-Stalinists among Republican leaders and International Brigade commanders than on fighting Franco. The defeat of the Republic, in Stalin's eyes, was caused not by the NKVD's diversionary efforts, but by the treachery of the heretics."

Zaisser quickly achieved the rank of brigadier general (initially commanding XIII International Brigade), and in 1937, he became leader of all the pro-Republican International Brigades operating in Spain. Following the end of the Spanish Civil War in 1939, Zaisser returned to Moscow to resume working for the Comintern, but was thrown into jail, apparently because of the failure of the Soviet intervention in Spain. During and after World War II, Zaisser taught Stalinist re-education courses to German prisoners of war.

== Government ==
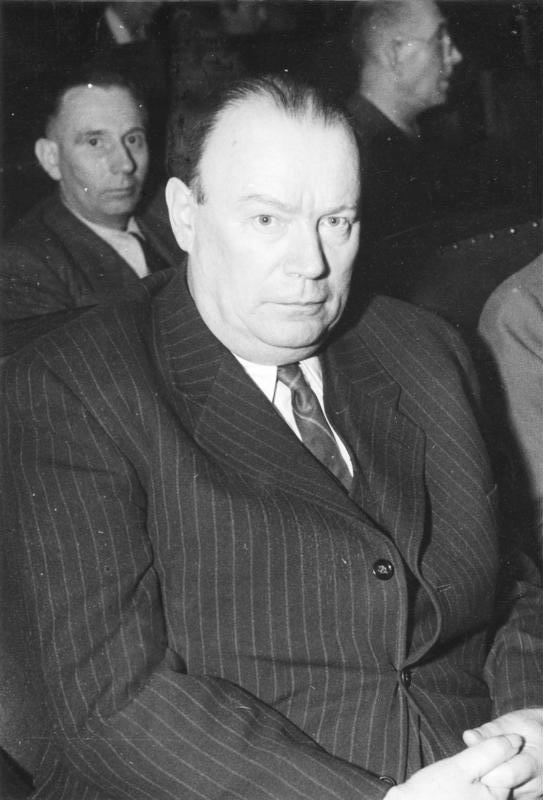
Zaisser during the 12th session of the Volkskammer, 22 February 1950

In 1947, Zaisser returned to Germany and joined the Socialist Unity Party (SED). Zaisser's career took off rapidly soon afterwards, and by 1948 he was Minister of the Interior and Deputy Minister-President of Saxony-Anhalt. From 1949 to 1954, Zaisser served as a representative in the Volkskammer and in 1950 worked on military and tactical issues at the Marx-Engels-Lenin-Stalin Institute, a facility to which very few non-Soviets had access.

In 1950, Zaisser gained membership in East Germany's Politburo and the Central Committee of the SED, thus becoming one of the most powerful men in the country. In the same year, Zaisser was awarded the Karl Marx Medal and appointed Director of the Ministry of State Security. Using his vast knowledge of intelligence work, Zaisser built the Stasi into a powerful organization.

After the death of Soviet leader Joseph Stalin on 5 March 1953, Moscow favored replacing East Germany's Stalinist party leader Walter Ulbricht and considered Zaisser a potential candidate. However, the workers' uprising, which was suppressed by the Red Army on 17 June, led to a backlash.

Alarmed by the uprising, Lavrenty Beria, the First Deputy Premier of the Soviet Union and head of the Ministry of Internal Affairs, personally travelled from Moscow to East Berlin. He conferred with Wilhelm Zaisser and with Erich Mielke, his deputy, both of whom he had known since the early 1930s. During both conversations, Beria demanded to know why the Stasi had failed to recognize the extreme discontent of the population and inform the Party leadership, which could then have prevented the uprising by taking extremely repressive measures in advance. Both Zaisser and Mielke answered Beria's questions circumspectly, and were accordingly left in their posts.

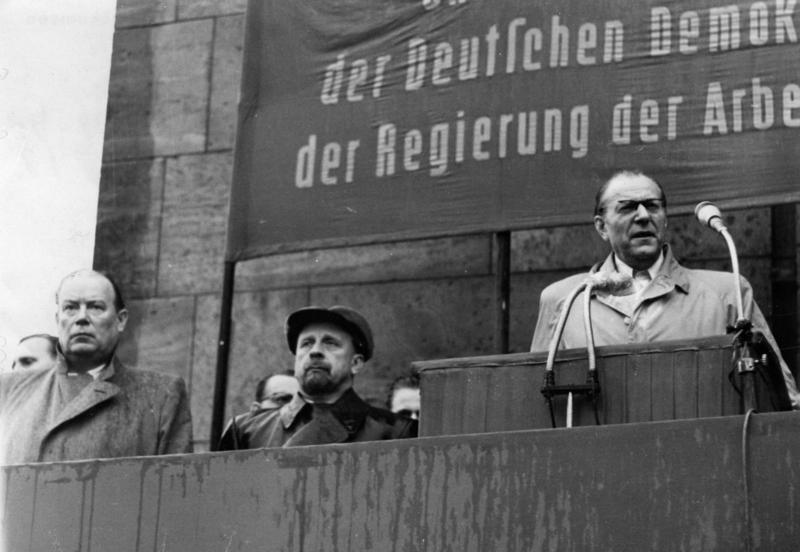
Zaisser (left) alongside Walter Ulbricht (center) and Otto Grotewohl at a pro-government rally following the East German uprising, 26 June 1953

Beria accordingly returned to Moscow intending to remove Ulbricht from power as Premier. However, he was arrested on 26 June 1953, as part of a coup d'état led by Nikita Khrushchev and Marshal Georgy Zhukov. Beria was tried on charges of 357 counts of rape and high treason. He was sentenced to death and shot by Red Army Colonel-General Pavel Batitsky on 23 December 1953.

Meanwhile, when the East German Politburo met on 8 July, it still seemed that Ulbricht would be deposed as Party General Secretary. While Zaisser conceded that the SED's whole Politburo was responsible for the "accelerated construction of socialism" and for the subsequent fallout. But he also added that to leave Ulbricht as Premier, "would be opposed catastrophic for the New Course".

Zaisser introduced a motion to replace Ulbricht with Rudolf Herrnstadt as First Secretary, and by the end of the meeting, only two Politburo members still supported Ulbricht's leadership: Free German Youth League chief Erich Honecker and Party Control Commission Chairman Hermann Matern. Ulbricht only managed to forestall a decision then and there with a promise to make a statement at the forthcoming 15th SED CC Plenum, scheduled for later that month.

Meanwhile, Mielke informed a Party commission looking for scapegoats that Zaisser, was calling for secret negotiations with West Germany and that, "he believed the Soviet Union would abandon the DDR."

Once he knew he had the complete support of new Soviet Premier Nikita Khrushchev, Ulbricht removed Zaisser and all other critics of his leadership from the SED's ruling Politburo. Zaisser was also forced to resign as Minister for State Security in July 1953. However, in 1953 Zaisser was decorated with the Order of Karl Marx.

Ultimately, Zaisser and all other anti-Ulbricht members of the Politburo and the Central Committee were dismissed from all their other positions. Ulbricht particularly accused Zaisser of not using more of the repressive power of the Stasi during the uprising of June 1953. Zaisser was stripped of all his posts, expelled from the SED, and classified as an enemy of the people.

== Death and legacy ==
Wilhelm Zaisser spent his final years working as a translator and at the Institute of Marxism and Leninism. He died in obscurity in East Berlin in 1958.

Only after the 1989 Peaceful Revolution and German Reunification in 1990, was Zaisser formally rehabilitated. His Party membership posthumously was also restored by the Party of Democratic Socialism (PDS), the successor party to the SED, in 1993.

== See also ==
- Rudolf Herrnstadt
- Heinrich Rau
- Anton Ackermann
- Ruhr Uprising
- International Brigades
- International Brigades order of battle

== Sources ==
- Koehler, John O. (1999). The Stasi: The Untold Story of the East German Secret Police. Boulder: Westview Press.
- Loth, Wilfried (1994). Stalins ungeliebtes Kind: warum Moskau die DDR nicht wollte [Stalin's unloved child: why Moscow didn't want the GDR] (in German). Berlin: Rowohlt. ISBN 9783871340857. OCLC 30475448.
