= Academy for Social Sciences at the Central Committee of the Socialist Unity Party of Germany =

East German party research institute

Academy for Social Sciences at the Central Committee of the SED
- Akademie für Gesellschaftswissenschaften beim ZK der SED
- Logo of the Socialist Unity Party of Germany
- Former name: Institute for Social Sciences at the Central Committee of the SED
- Active: December 21, 1951–October 1990
- Parent institution: Science Department of the Central Committee of the SED
- Director: Otto Reinhold (1961–1989)
- Total staff: 700 (1985)
- Location: Johannes-Dieckmann-Straße 19-23, East Berlin, East Germany

The Academy for Social Sciences at the Central Committee of the SED (German: Akademie für Gesellschaftswissenschaften beim ZK der SED) (AfG) was an East German research institution and cadre education center of the Socialist Unity Party of Germany (SED).

Despite its name, the AfG was more involved in theoretically justifying the SED's policies than actual social science research and worked mostly isolated from the SED Central Committee and its apparatus. The AfG's significance for the party's policy-making decreased considerably in the 1970s and 80s and it was abolished during the course of the Peaceful Revolution after trying to assert independence from the SED.

== Description ==
The AfG functioned as a research institution for the SED and further education center for party cadres of both the party and state apparatus. As a "supporting" institution for the party leadership, the AfG was less involved in actual research but in theoretically justifying and legitimizing the SED's policies. Among other things, it provided analyses for Central Committee departments. From its inception, its research was tightly controlled and monitored by the party, some research fields and topics being "off-limits" all together.

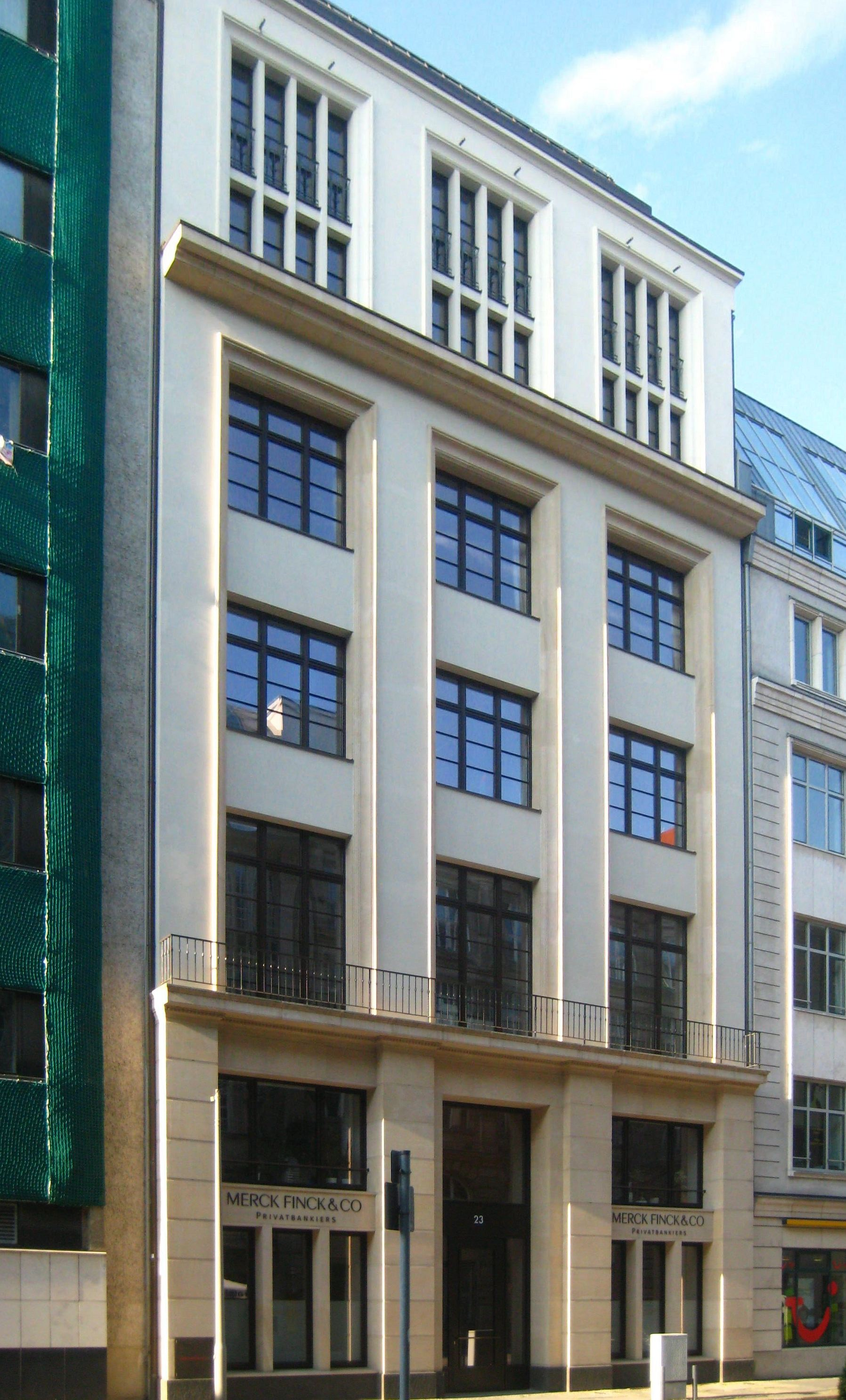
Taubenstraße 23, part of the AfG's building complex, previously and presently owned by the Merck, Finck & Co. private bank, in 2009

The AfG held a dominant role in the social sciences compared to state-run universities; of the 21 scientific councils (which were the central bodies coordinating research in their field) for the social sciences, six had their seat at the AfG, compared to just two for the "Karl Marx" Party Academy.

It had around 514 employees by December 1981, of which 185 were Central Committee nomenklatura. It grew to 700 employees and Aspiranten (doctoral candidates) by 1985. The AfG's employees were obligated to engage in "extensive propaganda activities". It was subordinate to the Central Committee Science Department, the Central Committee Secretariat decided on admission to the academy and deployment after successful completion of the studies.

Generally, prospective students (which were chosen by Central Committee departments as well as Bezirk SED party organizations) had to have been party members for at least five years, have university-level education and had to have gathered some experience as party functionaries.

The AfG's building complex, with 400 office spaces, was located in Johannes-Dieckmann-Straße 19-23 (today Taubenstraße) in East Berlin, near Gendarmenmarkt. The Academy of Sciences of the GDR was located in an adjacent street.

== History ==
The AfG was originally founded on 21 December 1951 as Institute for Social Sciences at the Central Committee of the SED and was given promotion and habilitation rights in 1953. On 21 December 1976, the institute's 25th anniversary, it was renamed to the Academy for Social Sciences.

Despite its name, the AfG was mostly isolated from the Central Committee. While its staff and organizational size steadily grew, the AfG's actual influence over the Central Committee's policy-making declined significantly after Erich Honecker came to power in 1971, Honecker being known for his anti-intellectualism. Under these circumstances, it eventually became more independent, for example publishing a memorandum in 1974 suggesting eliminating price controls.

In the later half of the 1980s, party functionaries purged from the Central Committee apparatus were often punitively transferred to the AfG. This includes former Politburo member Herbert Häber (Institute for Imperialism Research) and Manfred Uschner (Institute for Marxist–Leninist Philosophy).

In June 1986, Hans Koch, director of the AfG's Institute for Cultural and Art Studies, hung himself in a Berlin forest after him and his personal assistant faced criticism for a negative presentation on recreation time in East Germany. It was the sixth suicide among the AfG's faculty in a short period of time.

Ahead of the SED's XII. Party Congress in 1990, the AfG was tasked with further conceptualizing a "Socialism in the colors of the GDR" (meant to distance the GDR from Gorbachev's reform efforts), though the congress was cancelled during the Peaceful Revolution.

=== Peaceful Revolution ===
In November 1989, during the Peaceful Revolution, the AfG's employees decided on dropping "at the Central Committee of the SED" from its name and elected a new head. The AfG nevertheless folded in October 1990. A group around new head Rolf Reißig attempted to continue the AfG's work under a new organisation founded in early 1990, the now-defunct Berliner Institut für Sozialwissenschaftliche Studien (BISS e.V.).

The AfG's Taubenstraße building complex was taken over by the Treuhand and sold to private investors.

== Structure ==
=== Institutes ===
The AfG was organized into eight institutes:

- Institute for Marxist–Leninist Philosophy
- Institute for Political Economy
- Institute for Scientific Communism
- Institute for History
- Institute for the German and International Workers' Movement
- Institute for Sociology
- Institute for Marxist–Leninist Cultural and Art Studies
- Institute for Imperialism Research

Among the institutes, the Institute for Marxist–Leninist Philosophy was the most influential, shaping philosophy in the GDR at large, and the largest with 55 employees by December 1981. It was at the same time regarded as dogmatic, whereas the Institute for Sociology was deemed to be more critical, partly due to its access to information about the GDR's shortcomings.

=== Leadership ===
The AfG was led by a director (titled "rector" until 1963), who held the rank of a Central Committee department head.

Heads of the Academy for Social Sciences
Head	Tenure
Helene Berg	1951–1958
Ernst Hoffmann (acting)	1958–1961
Otto Reinhold	1961–1989
Rolf Reißig	1989–1990

The director was assisted by a rectorate including two prorectors, notably Heinz Hümmler (responsible for education and training) and Karl-Heinz Stiemerling (responsible for research) in the 1980s.

== Notable people ==
=== Alumni ===
- Martina Bunge, Minister of Social Affairs of Mecklenburg-Vorpommern, Member of the Bundestag (Dr. rer. oec., 1985)
- Helma Chrenko, historian and Latin Americanist (Dr. phil., 1976)
- Jürgen Dürrschmidt, Member of the Landtag of Saxony (Dipl.-Kult., 1985)
- Dagmar Enkelmann, Member of the Bundestag, lead candidate in the 2004 Brandenburg state election, chairwoman of the Rosa Luxemburg Foundation (Dr. phil., 1989)
- Carsten Gansel, Professor of Modern German Literature and the Didactics of German Literature and Media at Justus Liebig University Gießen (Dr. sc. phil., 1989)
- Bernd Grönwald, architect (Dr. sc. phil., 1977)
- Rosemarie Hein, Member of the Landtag of Saxony-Anhalt, Member of the Bundestag (Dr. phil., 1986)
- Jens-Peter Heuer, State Secretary in the Berlin Senate Department for Economics, Technology and Women (Dr. phil., 1986)
- Sonja Honecker, daughter of Erich Honecker (1984)
- Günther Jahn, First Secretary of the Free German Youth, First Secretary of the Bezirk Potsdam SED (Dr. rer. oec., 1961)
- Norbert Kertscher, First Secretary of the Bezirk Karl-Marx-Stadt SED (Dr. rer. oec., 1986)

=== Faculty ===
- Lothar Bisky, lecturer
- Helma Chrenko, lecturer at the Institute for the International Workers' Movement
- Hans Koch, director of the Institute for Cultural and Art Studies
- Rolf Reißig, director of the Institute for Scientific Socialism
