= Helene Berg =

East German academic and party functionary (1908–1999)

Director of the Institute for Opinion Research at the Central Committee of the SED
- In office 1974–1979
- Deputy: Joachim Jauch
- Preceded by: Karl Maron
- Succeeded by: Position abolished

Rector of the Institute for Social Sciences at the Central Committee
- In office 1951–1958
- Preceded by: Position established
- Succeeded by: Ernst Hoffmann (acting)

Personal details
- Born: Helene Veser; 10 April 1906 Mannheim, Grand Duchy of Baden, German Empire (now Baden-Württemberg, Germany)
- Died: 21 February 2006 (aged 99) Berlin, Germany
- Party: Party of Democratic Socialism (1989–2006); Socialist Unity Party (1946–1989); Communist Party of Germany (1927–1946)
- Other political affiliations: Communist Party of the Soviet Union (1929–1931)
- Spouse: Paul Wandel
- Education: International Lenin School
- Occupation: Teacher; Party Functionary
- Awards: Patriotic Order of Merit, 1st class; Banner of Labor; Clara Zetkin Medal; Order of Karl Marx; Grand Star of Peoples' Friendship
- Central institution membership: 1958–1989: Full member, Central Committee; Other offices held: 1951: Acting Director, "Karl Marx" Party Academy

Helene "Lene" Berg born Helene Veser (10 April 1906 – 21 February 2006) was a German communist politician and a resistance activist against National Socialism. Between 1958 and 1989 she was a member of the Central Committee of the ruling SED (party) in the German Democratic Republic (East Germany), where she was also director of the Berlin-based Academy for Social Sciences.

== Life ==
=== Early years ===
Helene Veser was born in Mannheim, in the Grand Duchy of Baden on 10 April 1906. Her father, formerly a miller, owned a timber business while her mother was in domestic service. Helene successfully completed her schooling in 1923 and entered a dressmaking apprenticeship, remaining in this type of work in Mannheim till 1928.

=== Activism ===
In 1921 she became a member of the SAJ (Sozialistische Arbeiter-Jugend), which was in effect the youth wing of the country's SPD (Germany's party of the moderate left). In 1922 she joined the German clothing workers' Trades Union, and in 1924 she joined the Young Communists (KJVD). She became a regional leader for the KJVD in what was at that time the Baden-Baden district. During this period Veser took part in anti-militaristic actions with regard to the French army of occupation in the Palatinate (Rhineland) region across the river from Mannheim, and undertook so-called spoiling missions ("Zersetzungsarbeit") involving the police there. In 1926 she attended the ADGB Trades Union confederation College in the Tinz quarter of Gera. Then in October 1927, a few months after her twenty-first birthday, Helene Veser joined the Communist Party (KPD).

Till 1928 Veser held her KJVD Baden regional leadership position. Then she relocated to Moscow where she attended the International Lenin School till 1931, taking Soviet citizenship and, in 1929, becoming a member of the Communist Party of the Soviet Union. She returned to Germany in 1931, now taking on more senior positions within the KPD. In 1931/32 Veser was an instructor with the party's Agitation and Propaganda department in Berlin. Then, in 1932, she took on the position of Agitation and Propaganda secretary for the KPD in the Hanover district, in the north of the country. This lasted till 1933 and the Nazi seizure of power which was quickly followed by a ban on non-Nazi political parties.

Veser continued with her (now illegal) work for the party till 1935. In 1933 she became the Agitation and Propaganda secretary in the party's Halle leadership team and later in the same year took over from Max Opitz the party leadership for the Württemberg region. 1934/35 found her operating under the cover name "Lotte" as a party instructor in the Saarland. In 1935 she escaped to France from where she emigrated to the Soviet Union where she was given the "party name", "Helene Berg", a name to which she switched and which she officially retained after the war ended.

=== Moscow ===
Between 1935 and 1937, using the cover name "Lene Neckar", Helene Berg was the deputy head of the German sector at the ILS, at the same time teaching in Moscow the history of (1) the Russian Communist Party and of (2) the German Workers' Movement. In 1938 she took a job with "Ino-Radio" in Moscow, and later worked as a consultant with the Moscow-based "Soyuz Jetfilm" children's film studio.

Till 1941 she worked with Rudolf Lindau creating collections on KPD history. When war broke out, using the cover name "Lene Ring" she had taken over the leadership of the German group at the International Lenin School, the Comintern School that temporarily moved to Ufa during the invasion. In September 1941 she was put in charge of the German section of the German section of the Antifa School for prisoners of war at Taliza, while still continuing to teach at the party academy in Moscow.

=== Back to (East) Germany ===
In April 1946 Berg returned to Germany, settling in the Soviet occupation zone which by now was in the process of becoming the German Democratic Republic. Berg became a member of the new country's ruling SED (party) and took a position as a teacher at the prestigious Karl Marx Academy in Liebenwalde. Between 1946 and 1951 she undertook various functions in the party's regional leadership in Saxony-Anhalt, working closely with Bernard Koenen. In 1951 she briefly became acting director of the Karl Marx Academy, before accepting a professorial directorship at the Party Central Committee's Social Sciences Institute, remaining in this post till 1958.

From 1954 till 1958 Berg was a candidate for the party central committee, which she joined in 1958, retaining her membership till 1989. Between 1958 and 1971 she was the German party's editor and representative for the Prague based international ideological newspaper World Marxist Review (WMR / "Problems of Peace and socialism" / "Проблемы мира и социализма"). Between 1972 and 1974 she was deputy director of the party's central committee's Opinion Research Institute, succeeding the institute's founder-director, Karl Maron, in 1974. She left that position in 1979, when the Institute was abolished on the instigation of Erich Honecker, who believed opinion research to be "manipulative". She thereafter acted as a consultant to the Central Committee's International Relations Department.

In 1990, following German reunification, the old East German SED (Party) was succeeded by the PDS, and Berg became a member of the reborn party's "Council of old people".

== Personal ==
Berg was married to East Germany's first Minister for Education, Paul Wandel. He died in 1995 but she died just seven weeks short of her one hundredth birthday on 21 February 2006.

== Awards ==
- 1955 Clara Zetkin Medal
- 1956 Patriotic Order of Merit in Silver
- 1965 Banner of Labor
- 1966 Order of Karl Marx
- 1968 Patriotic Order of Merit in Gold
- 1971 Patriotic Order of Merit - Gold Honour clip
- 1976 Honorary doctorate from the Social Sciences Academy of the Party Central Committee
- 1976 Star of People's Friendship in Gold
- 1981 Great Star of People's Friendship in Gold
