= Paul Wandel =

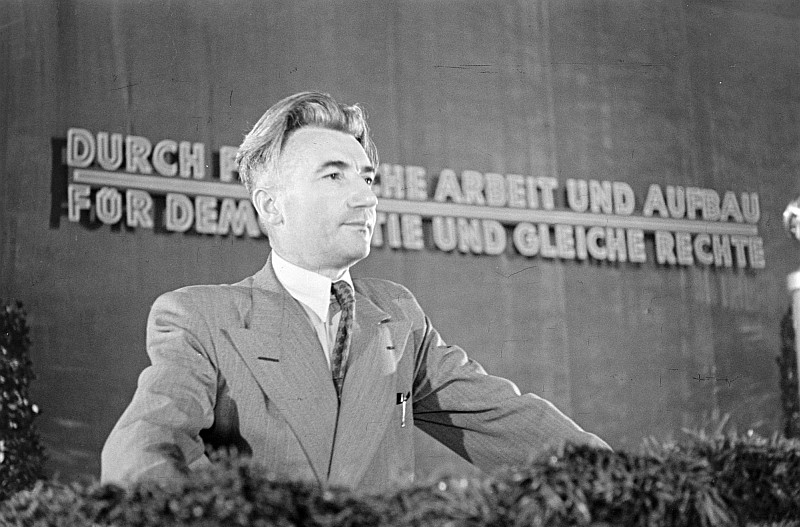

Ambassador of the German Democratic Republic to China
- In office 1958–1961
- Preceded by: Richard Gyptner
- Succeeded by: Josef Hegen

Member of the Volkskammer
- In office 1954–1958

Minister of Education of the German Democratic Republic
- In office 1949–1952
- Prime Minister: Otto Grotewohl
- Preceded by: Office established
- Succeeded by: Elisabeth Zaisser

Personal details
- Born: 16 February 1905 Mannheim, Grand Duchy of Baden, German Empire
- Died: 3 June 1995 (aged 90) Berlin, Germany
- Citizenship: East German
- Party: Party of Democratic Socialism (1989–); Socialist Unity Party (1946–1989); Communist Party of Germany (1926–1946)
- Other political affiliations: Communist Party of the Soviet Union
- Spouse: Helene Berg
- Education: International Lenin School
- Awards: Patriotic Order of Merit, honor clasp (1980); Order of Karl Marx (1975); Star of People's Friendship (1970); Patriotic Order of Merit, in gold (1955)

Paul Wandel (February 16, 1905 – June 3, 1995) was a German communist politician and statesman in the German Democratic Republic who served as the first Minister of People's Education.

== Biography ==
In 1919 Wandel completed his apprenticeship as an electrical engineer and later worked as a technician. In the same year he joined the Sozialistischen Arbeiterjugend and later on the Young Communist League of Germany and finally the Communist Party of Germany in 1926.

He quickly rose through the ranks and became the first secretary of the KPD district committee in Baden and later became chairman of the parliamentary group of the KPD in Mannheim.

In 1931 he was sent to the Soviet Union and graduated from the International Lenin School, joined the All-Union Communist Party (b) and worked at the Marx–Engels–Lenin Institute.

After the end of World War II, Wandel returned to Germany and served as the chairman of the Central Administration for People's Education from 1945 to 1949 and then Minister of People's Education from 1949 to 1952. After his term as minister ended he was the secretary of Culture and Education Department at the Central Committee of the Socialist Unity Party.

From 1958 to 1961 he served as DDR's ambassador to the People's Republic of China and then was appointed deputy Foreign Minister.

From 1964 to 1976 he was Chairman of League of Friendship Among Nations and from 1982 to 1989 he was chairman of the DDR–People's Republic of China Friendship Committee.

After German reunification he became a member of the Party of Democratic Socialism.
