= 1889 Ruhr miner's strike =

Labor distpute and strike

Announcement poster for the worker strike.

The Ruhr miner's strike of 1889 was one of the largest labor strikes in German history, and the largest at the time. It took place in the highly industrial Ruhr area of the German Empire as a consequence of the 1873 Stock Market Crash, poor working conditions and the anti-socialist laws imposed by Chancellor Otto Von Bismarck. It saw over 100.000 people participating in the strike and it was active during the months of April and May. It led to the creation of the Union of Miners of Germany (which would later be called the "Old Union" and is the modern day IG Bergbau, Chemie, Energie)

== Background ==
The strike originated as a result of the poor working and living conditions of working-class families in this era. Most of them, like in many other industrialized regions of Europe, lived with their families in closed, cramped, and poorly maintained apartments with costly rent. Conditions in the mines as well were rather miserable, with barely any safety regulations in place and over 10 hour work shifts, alongside minimal pay.

Because of this, many workers in different areas of the empire started supporting workers movements, such as the Free Trade Unions or the SDAP (Sozialdemokratische Arbeiterpartei Deutschlands, which later turned into the modern-day SPD) . However, with the "Bismarckian" anti-socialist laws passed by the Reichstag in 1878, many social democrat politicians and supporters were repressed or prosecuted.

Workers in the Ruhr organized a strike of about 21,000 miners in 1872. Although this was largely unsuccessful and it led to the workers subsequently organizing better, albeit initially without an official union or clear leadership.

German miners of the Ruhr area with a horse.

Mining workers wanted wage increases like that of the mining entrepreneurs. The aim was a 15-20% wage increase, no more extra shifts, a reduction to 8 hours of working time, including entrances and exits, and, overall, better working conditions.

== Strike ==
A drawing of German Ruhr strikers, May 1889.

The strike began on the 25th of April in Bochum. At first, the strikers managed to get an 8.2% increase in pay and a short period of calm went onwards. However, the strikes quickly resumed on the 4th of May after police repression had started and about 80 union miners were fired from their positions and a full-on General Strike had begun. Numerous other workforces in Herne, Dortmund, Hörde, Witten, Oberhausen, Essen, and Recklinghausen deciding to join the strike.

As the strike continued, the two sides became increasingly aggressive. In order to “protect” their facilities and the miners that were willing to work, many mines requested police or even military protection. The tense atmosphere of the strikes erupted into violence and the use of weapons against the miners, which, on May 12th, resulted in several workers being shot and a substantial increase in police brutality.

After the incident, on May 14, the strike committee decided to send a delegation to Kaiser Wilhelm II. The delegates (Friedrich Bunte, August Siegel and Ludwig Schröder) were received in Berlin by the emperor, whom they intended to appeal to as the supreme mining authority. Although the emperor criticized the strike, he did agree to have the grievances officially investigated. The talks with the emperor brought the strikers a great deal of attention, particularly among the middle classes of the empire, who tended to be skeptical on socialist ideas.

Through the mediation of Friedrich Hammacher, a member of the Reichstag, a protocol was finalized the following day, establishing an 8-hour workday for the miners, including a half-hour each for entering and exiting the mine. In addition, overtime shifts were to be worked on after prior agreement between the mine administration and the workers’ unions. When the association signaled a willingness to accommodate the miners’ interests, the strike initially subsided. However, they started once again on May 21st as the mining companies failed to comply with, and ignored, the agreements made in Berlin, and even introduced blacklists containing the names of many of striking miners in to make it impossible for them to find employment in the mining industry. In early June 1889, the strikes lost force and came to an end without any immediate lasting gains for the workers.

Drawing of German mounted troops attacking strikers.

The strike triggered the founding of the Union of Miners of Germany in the Rhineland and Westphalia, the starting point for the breakthrough of the trade union movement in the Ruhr mining industry.

== Consequences ==
The strike and its reception by the general public would indirectly clear the path for progressive labor laws to be passed in the empire, such as the Workers' Protection Act of June 1, 1891. In addition, regulations on the protection of women, protection against child labor, restrictions to night work and a reduction of the 10-hour work day and were also implemented partly thanks to this strike and the movement that led to it. It also contained provisions for a 24-hour Sunday rest for all workers in factories, workshops, mines, construction sites and shipyards.

This strike also massively contributed to the popularizing of leftist ideas in Germany and the radicalization of said ideas and groups, such as the SPD which was already in a path of changing its political approach, eliminating any sort of compromise or collaboration with the federal government in Berlin
