= Möllen =

District of Voerde in North Rhine-Westphalia, Germany

- Ortsteil of Voerde
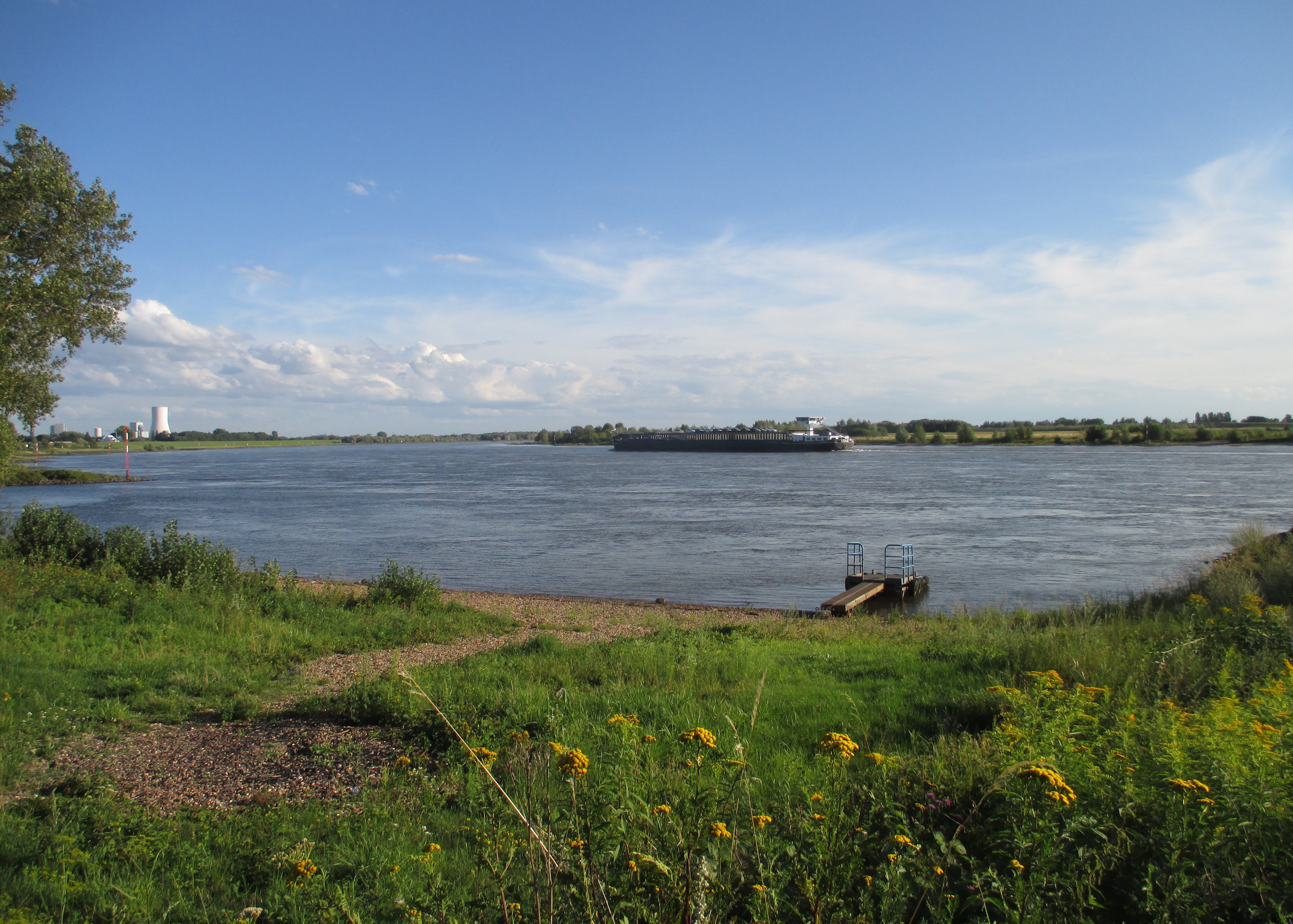

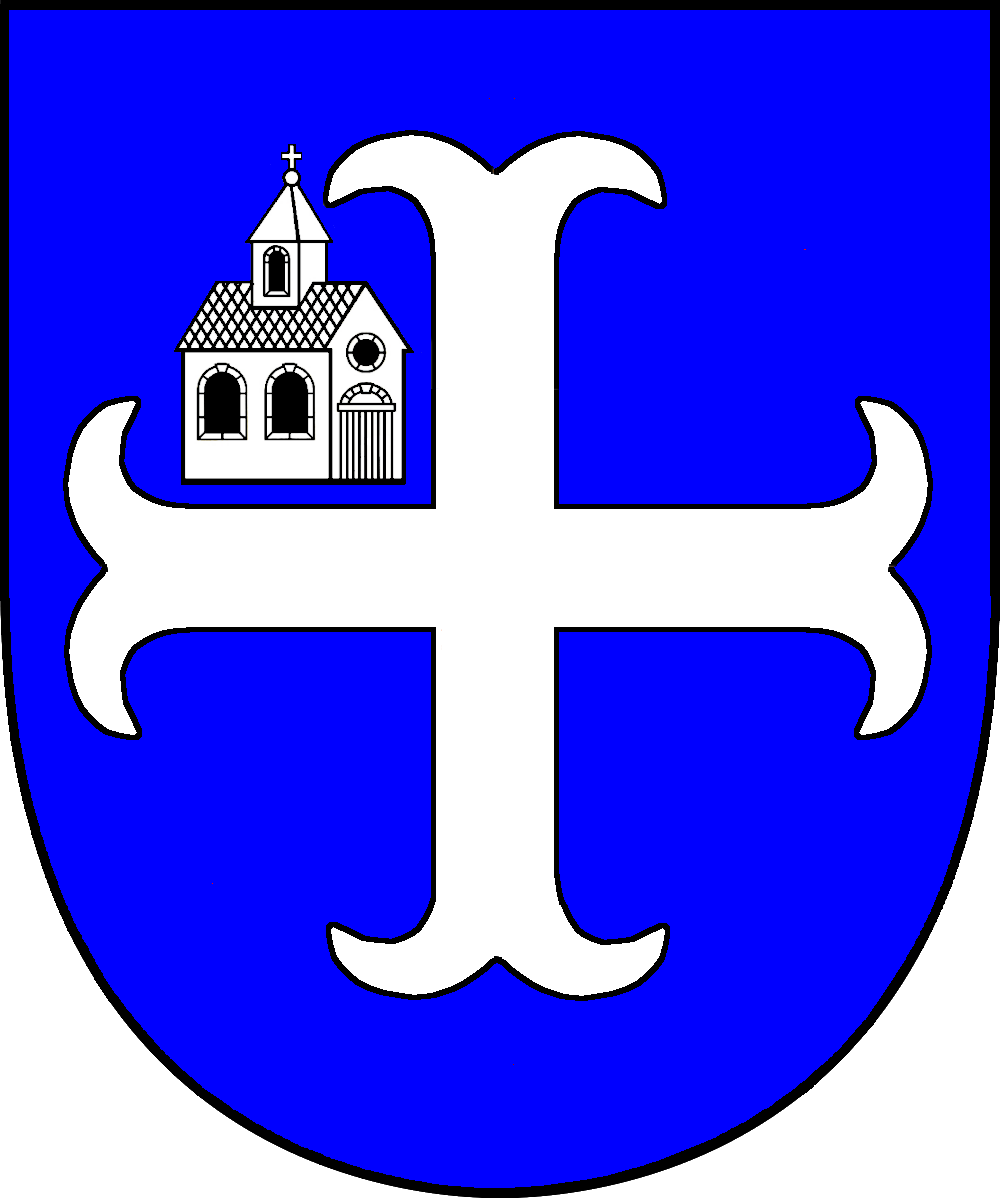
- Coat of arms
- Interactive map of Möllen
- Location within Germany Location within North Rhine-Westphalia
- Coordinates: 51°34′54″N 06°42′04″E
- Country: Germany
- State: North Rhine-Westphalia
- Admin. region: Düsseldorf
- District: Wesel
- Town: Voerde
- Time zone: UTC+01:00 (CET)
  - Summer (DST): UTC+02:00 (CEST)
- Vehicle registration: WES

Möllen is the southernmost administrative district of Voerde in Wesel district, North Rhine-Westphalia, having 3040 inhabitants.

== History ==
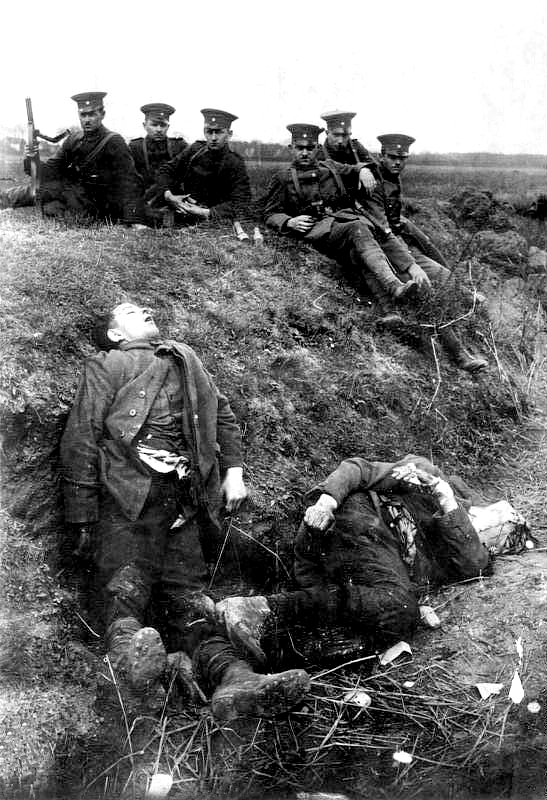
Members of the Reichswehr and shot members of the Red Ruhr Army, 2 April 1920

The Haus Wohnung (the region's water castle) was built in the fourteenth century. The former school was established in 1911. The town was a scene of some of the fighting during the suppression of the Ruhr uprising. The Protestant church was built between 1960 and 1965 and the Catholic Church of St. Barbara in 1963.
