= Ruhr uprising =

1920 left-wing workers' revolt in Germany

- Part of the reactions to the Kapp Putsch, revolutions of 1917–1923 and political violence in Germany (1918–1933)
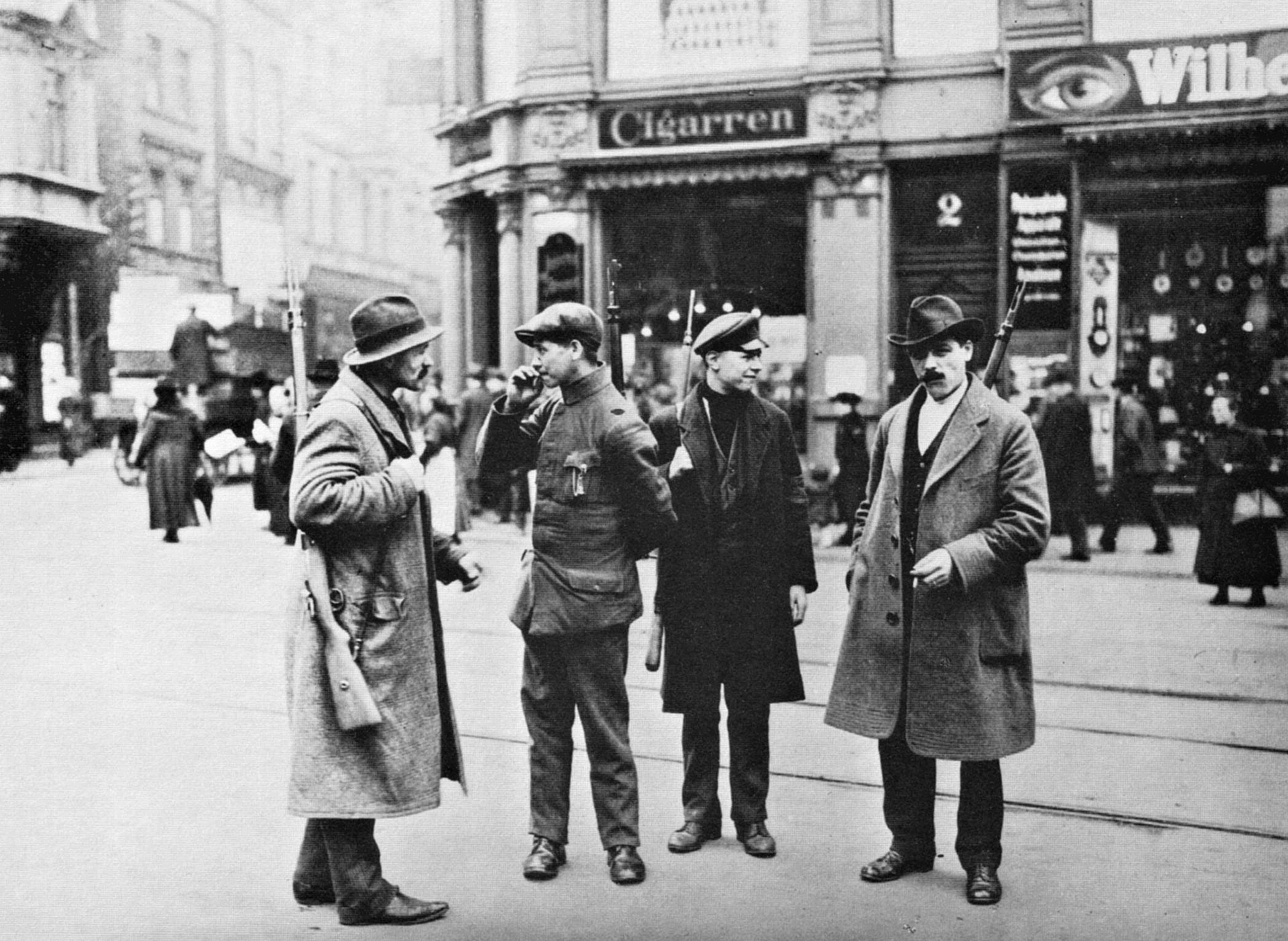
- Members of the Ruhr Red Army in Dortmund
Date	13 March – 6 April 1920; (3 weeks and 3 days)
Location	Ruhr, Germany
Result	Government victory

Belligerents
Weimar Republic: Reichswehr; Sicherheitspolizei; Freikorps: Freikorps Lichtschlag; Marinebrigade Loewenfeld	Ruhr Red Army: KPD; KAPD; USPD; FAUD

Commanders and leaders
Oskar von Watter	Workers' councils

Strength
From 30 March over 45,000	50,000–80,000

Casualties and losses
645 killed and missing Reichswehr: 208 killed 123 missing Police: 41 killed Freikorps: 273 killed	1,000+ rebels killed

The Ruhr uprising (German: Ruhraufstand) or March uprising (Märzaufstand) was an uprising that occurred in the Ruhr region of Germany from 13 March to 6 April 1920. It was a left-wing workers' revolt triggered by the call for a general strike in response to the Kapp Putsch, then became an armed rebellion when far-left workers used the strike as an opportunity to attempt the establishment of a council republic.

Spontaneously formed workers' councils sprang up across the Ruhr during the strike and took control of the region with the support of 50,000–80,000 armed workers who formed the Red Ruhr Army. Early attempts at suppression by the Freikorps were defeated which led the German government in Berlin to negotiate a peaceful settlement without success. The Reichswehr and other Freikorps troops under the command of Oskar von Watter were sent into the Ruhr and acted with extreme brutality, including summary executions of prisoners and the killing of wounded fighters. The Red Ruhr Army was defeated by early April and most surviving rebels were arrested or fled to the French-occupied Rhineland.

An estimated 1,000 workers and about 600 Reichswehr and Freikorps soldiers were killed. France briefly occupied some cities in Germany, including Frankfurt and Darmstadt, in response to Reichswehr's activity in the Ruhr. The Social Democratic Party, which had led the governments of the Weimar Republic until then, lost 62 seats in the Reichstag at the June 1920 general election, in part because of the way it had handled the uprising.

== Background ==
=== Political context ===
On 13 March 1920, the Kapp Putsch occurred when right-wing elements attempted to overthrow the elected government of the Weimar Republic. The Freikorps unit Marinebrigade Ehrhardt marched into Berlin, occupied the government buildings, then installed Wolfgang Kapp as the new Chancellor of Germany and Walther von Lüttwitz as the Minister of Defence. The legitimate government, lacking support from the military, fled Berlin. The Social Democratic Party (SPD) members of Chancellor Gustav Bauer's government called for a general strike to topple the Kapp Putsch. The Communist Party of Germany (KPD), the Independent Social Democrats (USPD) and major trade union associations all supported the SPD's call. The general strike drew around 12 million workers and was crucial in bringing about the Kapp Putsch's collapse on 17 March 1920.

A more fundamental cause of the violent uprising was the schism in the left-wing parties after the strike, which had become evident in the early days of the German Revolution of 1918–1919. The moderate SPD, which was quickly able to dominate the course of events, wanted to establish a parliamentary republic, but a substantial number of workers, mostly supporters of the USPD and KPD, fought for a council republic on the Revolutionary Russia model. Both the Spartacist uprising and the Berlin March Battles of 1919 were the result of the continuing anger among many leftist workers that the revolution had not achieved the goals they had hoped for in November 1918: nationalisation of key industries, recognition of the 1919 workers' and soldiers' councils, and establishment of a council republic. The split in the left-wing parties was visible in the goals they supported in the general strike against the Kapp Putsch. The SPD wanted to restore the elected government that it led, while the USPD's aim was to replace it with a socialist-only government. The KPD at first refused to do anything that would help the SPD, but since many of its members had joined the strike, it later said that it saw the strike as an opening of a battle against "military dictatorship".

== Takeover of the Ruhr ==
The reaction to the Kapp Putsch was particularly strong in the Ruhr, a heavily industrialised region of western Germany where the left-wing parties and unions had a large presence. The first demonstrations took place on 14 March 1920, where 20,000 people turned out in Bochum. On 15 March, a meeting was held in Elberfeld attended by representatives of the SPD, USPD, KPD and free unions. They issued a call for all parties of the Left to work together against the "reaction".

Across the Ruhr area, spontaneously formed "executive councils" (Vollzugsräte) took power after disarming the local Security Police and Reichswehr forces. The councils were dominated mostly by the KPD and USPD, with only limited participation by the SPD. The anarcho-syndicalist Free Workers' Union of Germany (FAUD) was also represented. The councils used local "workers' defence" (Arbeiterwehr) units during armed action. Their weapons came from the Citizens' Defense groups and, after their first successful engagements, from defeated Freikorps units. It was from the workers' defence groups that the Red Ruhr Army was formed. At its peak, the Red Ruhr Army's strength is estimated to have been 50,000 to 80,000 members. Of those who belonged to union-based organizations, a small majority came from the free unions and the remainder from the FAUD. Among members of political parties, 60% were KPD, 30% USPD and 10% SPD.

On 15 March, units of the Red Ruhr Army near Wetter defeated the vanguard of the Freikorps Lichtschlag, a pro-Kapp Putsch unit of the Freikorps, killing its commanding officer Captain Otto Hasenclever. On 16 March, members of the Red Ruhr Army occupied the city of Dortmund.

On 17 March, the full Freikorps Lichtschlag of 2,500 men were halted and badly beaten near Aplerbeck by 10,000 men of the Red Ruhr Army, who then captured their weapons. Around 600 Freikorps Lichtschlag members were taken prisoner and their artillery guns were captured.

In Essen, which had been taken on 18 March, a central committee of the workers' councils was formed two days later. Other central committees followed in Hagen and Mülheim (where it was controlled by syndicalists), while Duisburg was in the hands of anarchists. The uprising had no common leadership or political program. In general, their aims were revolutionary and hostile to the Weimar Republic. They saw the revolution of 1918–1919 as failed and wanted radical social and economic changes, especially nationalization of key industries.

By 22 March, the whole of the Ruhr region was under control of the rebels.

== Attempts at a peaceful settlement ==
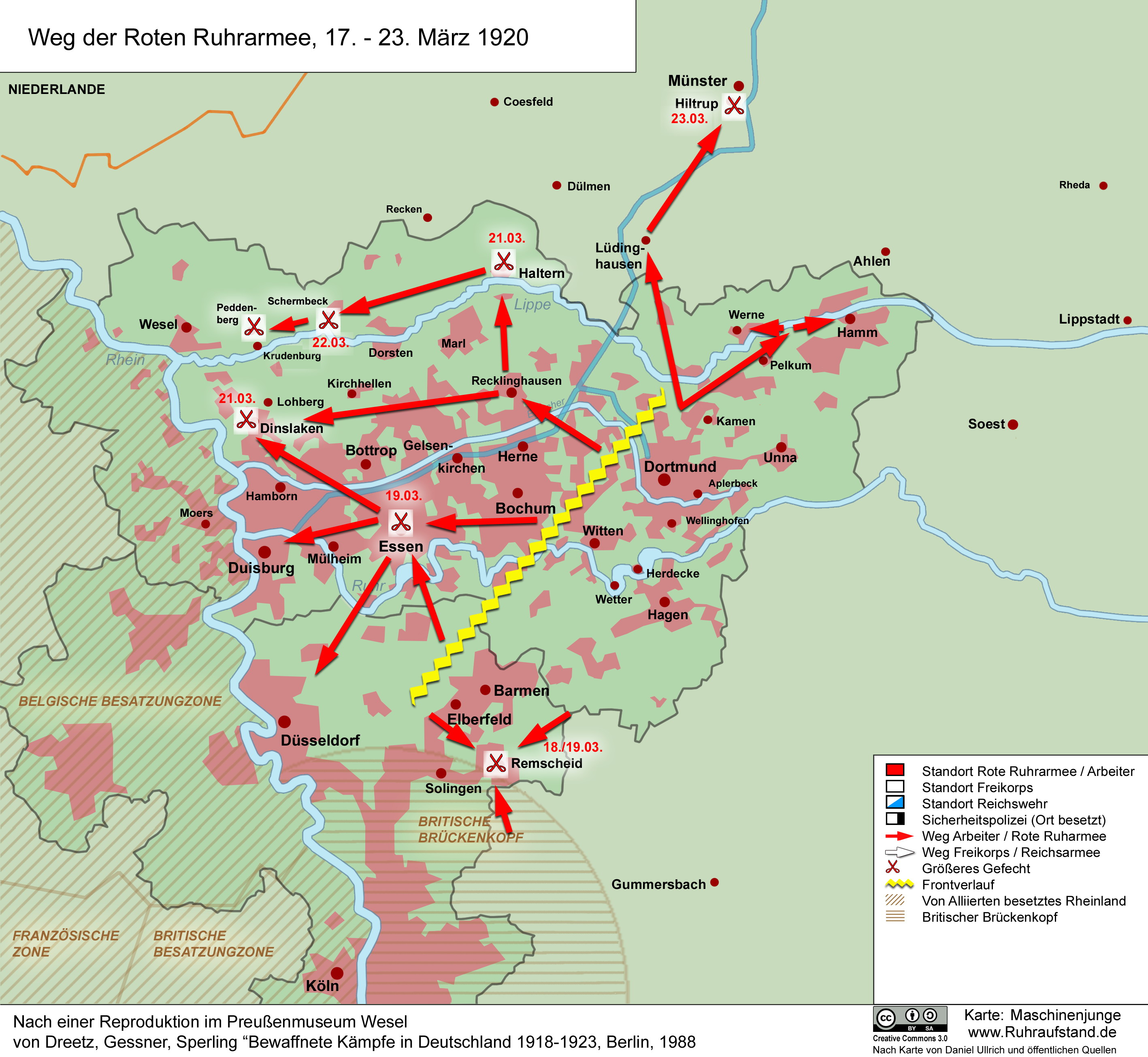
Movements of the Red Ruhr Army, 17–23 March 1920

On 22 March, the general strike against the Kapp Putsch was officially declared over by the General German Trade Union Federation (ADGB), the USPD and the KPD. The call by the USPD for a socialist workers' government to prevent Germany from moving to the right were rejected. As a result, few strikers returned to work.

On 24 March, the government issued an ultimatum demanding that the workers' councils put an end to the strike and uprising by 30 March, but then quickly extended the date to 2 April. An attempt to settle the conflict peacefully produced the Bielefeld Agreement. The negotiating group included members from the unions, political parties, executive councils, city administrations and representatives from Berlin. Carl Severing, the Reich and Prussian commissioner for the Ruhr region, made it clear that Berlin wanted to see the Red Ruhr Army disarmed and its weapons handed over. The final agreement achieved those ends and added clauses promising amnesty for anyone who had broken the law in defence of the Republic against the putschists. It also stated that the handing over of weapons would be handled locally and that if it were done "loyally", the Reichswehr would not enter the Ruhr. The USPD and the Hagen Central Committee accepted the terms of the Bielefeld Agreement, while the KPD and Essen Central Committee wanted new negotiations. Leaders of the Red Ruhr Army thought that it would be better to fight than accept the compromises in the agreement.

On 25 March, the government of Gustav Bauer resigned. The following day President Friedrich Ebert appointed Hermann Müller of the SPD the new Chancellor. The situation in Duisburg – which was in the hands of anarchists – had become so serious by then, however, that the Müller government responded to the Essen Committee with an ultimatum to accept the agreement by 28 March. General Oskar von Watter, the regional Reichswehr commander, added the condition the next day that all weapons had to be handed in by 30 March (a deadline that clearly could not be met) without consulting Berlin. The consequence was the renewed proclamation of a general strike by the Essen Central Committee. Around 330,000 workers, more than 75% of the workforce in the Ruhr, responded to the call.

Severing then reached an agreement with the executive councils for a deadline of 2 April to turn in weapons, and he promised to keep the army out of the Ruhr. At a meeting at Essen on 1 April, the leaders of the Red Ruhr Army agreed that there was no point in continuing the fight, but it had by then splintered into numerous, largely independent groups over which the leaders had no control. In addition, as Severing wrote later – and without exaggeration, as historian Heinrich August Winkler noted:

Reports of extortion and looting [by the insurgents], of abuse and shootings, increased at an alarming rate. The calls for help from the population, the city administrations and the leaders of the political parties became more and more urgent.

At the end of the day on 2 April, few weapons had been turned in. The Reichswehr and Freikorps, including the Marinebrigade Loewenfeld, which had been a major participant in the Kapp Putsch, then entered the Ruhr.

== Suppression ==
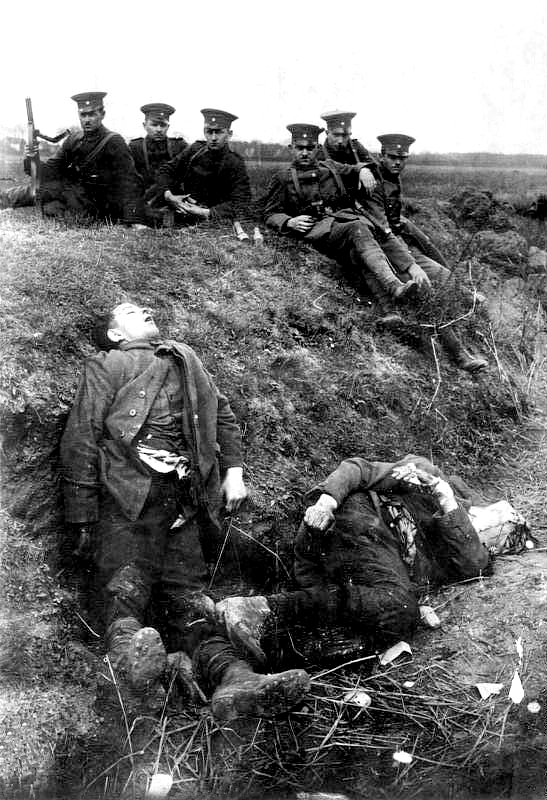
Members of the Reichswehr sitting above the bodies of Red Ruhr Army fighters who had been shot, 2 April 1920, at Möllen, near Duisburg

The experienced and heavily armed Reichswehr and Freikorps troops entered the Ruhr and quickly ended the uprising with acts of violence and cruelty that dwarfed the workers' "Red Terror". There were mass arrests and shootings without it always being clear whether the victims were members of the Red Ruhr Army or not. Wounded fighters were shot, as were ten female medics with the Red Ruhr Army who were carrying pistols. Many fighters were reported as having been shot while fleeing, indicating that they were shot in the back. Fifty had been summarily executed and an additional 205 condemned by drumhead courts before Ebert forbade them on 3 April. Von Watter defended himself from other charges that his men had engaged in unlawful behaviour by citing a letter from the Ministry of the Reichswehr that stated, "You are given complete freedom to do what the situation demands".

On 5 April, a large part of the Red Ruhr Army fled to the French occupied zone of the Rhineland. The skirmish that took place in Gelsenkirchen the next day marked the final end of the uprising.

== Aftermath ==
The number of insurgents killed in the Ruhr uprising has never been accurately determined. Heinrich August Winkler puts the number at "well over 1,000", the majority of them killed after being captured. The Reichswehr lost 208 killed and 123 missing; the Security Police 41 dead. The number of Freikorps deaths has been put at 273.

In response to the Reichswehr's entry into the demilitarized Ruhr in violation of the Treaty of Versailles, the French occupied the Maingau region, which included the cities of Frankfurt, Hanau and Darmstadt, on 6 April. They would withdraw on 17 May, not long after the German military intervention in the Ruhr ended. The Reichswehr halted their advance through the Ruhr when the British threatened to occupy the Bergisches Land if they did not.

Approximately 3,000 workers were arrested and held under often very poor conditions while they awaited trial. The military courts that tried them at first ignored the Müller cabinet's amnesty for those who had fought against the Kapp Putsch, but the situation improved after civil authorities intervened. On 12 April, Von Watter ordered his troops to cease "illegal behaviour" though they continued to shoot at alleged members of the Red Ruhr Army for days afterwards.

The state of emergency in the Ruhr was lifted in June, in time for the 1920 federal election, which proceeded smoothly. The SPD lost 62 seats in the Reichstag, and for the first time since the establishment of the Weimar Republic was not part of the ruling coalition. Much of the SPD's poor showing at the election was attributed to its handling of the Ruhr uprising, losing left-wing voters to the USPD.

== See also ==
- Members of the Ruhr Red Army
- History of the Ruhr District
- 1889 Ruhr miner's strike
