= XXVI Corps =

26 Corps, 26th Corps, Twenty Sixth Corps, or XXVI Corps may refer to:

== Germany ==
- XXVI Reserve Corps, German Empire, World War I
- XXVI Army Corps (Wehrmacht), Nazi Germany, World War II

== Italy ==
- XXVI Army Corps (Italy)

== Russia and Soviet Union ==
=== Russian Empire ===
- 26th Army Corps (Russian Empire)

=== Soviet Union ===
- 26th Mechanized Corps
- 26th Tank Corps

== United Kingdom ==
=== Artillery Volunteer Corps ===
- 26th (Birkdale) Lancashire Artillery Volunteer Corps

=== Rifle Volunteer Corps ===
- 26th (Kingsbridge) Devonshire Rifle Volunteer Corps
- 26th Kent (Royal Arsenal) Rifle Volunteer Corps
- 26th (Customs and Excise) Middlesex Rifle Volunteer Corps
- 26th (Cyclist) Middlesex Rifle Volunteer Corps
- 26th (Shaftesbury Park) Surrey Rifle Volunteer Corps

== See also ==
- List of military corps by number
- 26th Army (disambiguation)
- 26th Battalion (disambiguation)
- 26th Brigade (disambiguation)
- 26th Division (disambiguation)
- 26th Regiment (disambiguation)
- 26th Squadron (disambiguation)
- 26th (disambiguation)
