= 26th Cavalry =

26th Cavalry may refer to:

== Divisions ==
- 26th Cavalry Division (Soviet Union)

== Regiments ==
- 26th Cavalry Regiment (United States, 1922–1946), Philippine Scouts
- 26th Cavalry Regiment (United States, 1963–1988)
- 26th King George's Own Light Cavalry

=== American Civil War regiments ===
==== Confederate Army ====
- 26th Texas Cavalry Regiment
- 26th Virginia Cavalry Regiment

==== Union Army ====
- 26th New York Cavalry Regiment

== See also ==
- 26th Division (disambiguation)
- 26th Brigade (disambiguation)
- 26th Regiment (disambiguation)
- 26th (disambiguation)
