= 26th Army =

26th Army may refer to:

- 26th Army (People's Republic of China)
- 26th Army (Soviet Union)
- 26th Air Army, Soviet Union

== See also ==
- List of armies by number
- XXVI Corps (disambiguation)
- 26th Division (disambiguation)
- 26th Brigade (disambiguation)
- 26th Regiment (disambiguation)
- 26th Battalion (disambiguation)
- 26th Squadron (disambiguation)
- 26th (disambiguation)
