= 26th =

26th is the ordinal form of the number 26. 26th or Twenty-sixth may also refer to:

- A fraction, 1/26, equal to one of 26 equal parts
- 26th of the month, a recurring calendar date

== Geography ==
- 26th meridian east, a line of longitude
- 26th meridian west, a line of longitude
- 26th parallel north, a circle of latitude
- 26th parallel south, a circle of latitude
- 26th Avenue
- 26th station

== Military ==
- 26th Army (disambiguation)
- 26th Battalion (disambiguation)
- 26th Brigade (disambiguation)
- 26th Division (disambiguation)
- 26th Regiment (disambiguation)
- 26th Squadron (disambiguation)

== Other ==
- Twenty-sixth Amendment (disambiguation)
  - Twenty-sixth Amendment to the United States Constitution
- 26th century
- 26th century BC

== See also ==
- 26 (disambiguation)
