= M'Đrăk district =

M'Drắk district Huyện M'Drắk
- District
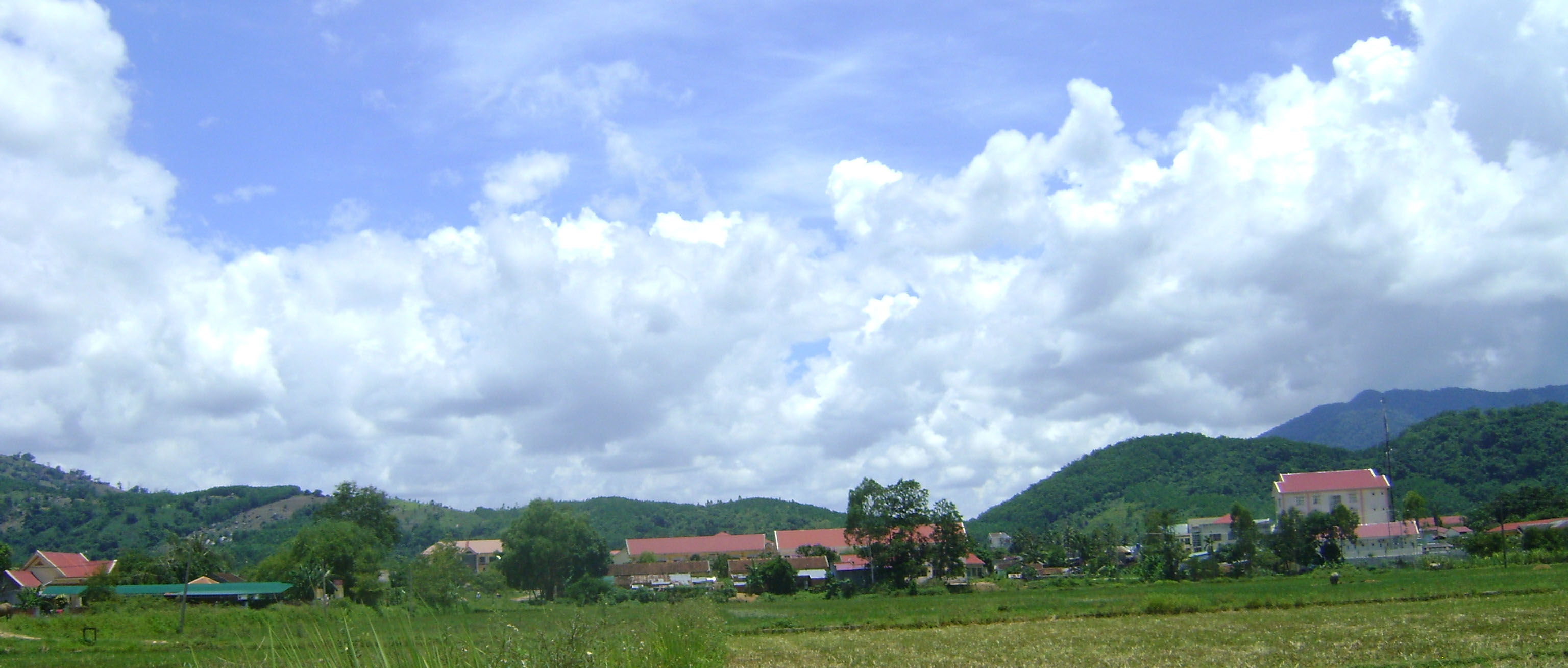
- View of M'Drak town
- Interactive map of M'Drắk district
- Country: Vietnam
- Region: Central Highlands
- Province: Đắk Lắk
- Capital: M'Drắk

Area
  - Total: 520 sq mi (1,348 km^{2})

Population (2018)
  - Total: 71,128
- Time zone: UTC+7 (Indochina Time)

M'Drắk is a rural district (huyện) of Đắk Lắk province in the Central Highlands region of Vietnam. As of 2003 the district had a population of 56,887, rising to 71,128 in 2018. The district covers an area of 1,348 km^{2}. The district capital lies at M'Đrăk. M'Đrăk is one of the most remote districts of Đắk Lắk. In the east of the province is Phoenix Pass, which connects Đắk Lắk with Khánh Hòa. The district borders the districts of Ea Kars and Krông Bông, as well as the provinces of Phú Yên and Khánh Hòa.

== Ethnicity ==
The main ethnic groups in the district are: Êđê, Tày, Nùng, M'nong, Dao and Thái. Kinh people constitute over 50% of the population.

== Administration ==
M'Đrăk district has 13 administrative units, which includes the communes of:

- M'Drắk township
- Ea Pil
- Cư M'Ta
- Krông Á
- Cư Króa
- Ea H'Mlay
- Ea M'doal
- Ea Riêng
- Ea Trang
- Krông Jing
- Ea Lai
- Cư Prao
- Cư San

== Nature ==
Most areas of the district consists of the M'Đrăk plateau. Here, abundant forest resources stand on most of the Highlands that are convenient for large pasture cattle breeding. M'Đrăk is a name familiar to many people by mentioning Vietnam Hey, a song by the musician Nguyễn Cường.

M'Đrăk is located in a tropical monsoon climate, although the annual average temperature is quite low compared to other regions, the average amount of sunshine per year is 1700 hours, and the average annual rainfall is 2500 mm.

M'Đrăk has a small intensive coffee industry. It also has specialties such as avocado, durian, jackfruit, litchi and many kinds of crops such as sugar, green beans and corn.

There are breeding areas for animals such as cows, goats and horses within the district.

Places such as the Phoenix Pass, Mt Hope and the waterfalls of Đray K'nao and Ea M'doal are also located here.

== Climate ==
Climate data for M'Đrăk, elevation 478 m (1,568 ft)
Month	Jan	Feb	Mar	Apr	May	Jun	Jul	Aug	Sep	Oct	Nov	Dec	Year
Record high °C (°F)	33.9 (93.0)	36.1 (97.0)	36.9 (98.4)	38.7 (101.7)	37.3 (99.1)	36.0 (96.8)	34.7 (94.5)	35.4 (95.7)	35.2 (95.4)	32.8 (91.0)	32.5 (90.5)	30.1 (86.2)	38.7 (101.7)
Mean daily maximum °C (°F)	24.5 (76.1)	27.1 (80.8)	30.1 (86.2)	32.3 (90.1)	32.4 (90.3)	31.2 (88.2)	30.9 (87.6)	30.5 (86.9)	30.1 (86.2)	28.0 (82.4)	25.7 (78.3)	23.9 (75.0)	28.9 (84.0)
Daily mean °C (°F)	20.4 (68.7)	21.7 (71.1)	23.7 (74.7)	25.7 (78.3)	26.3 (79.3)	26.3 (79.3)	25.9 (78.6)	25.8 (78.4)	25.0 (77.0)	23.8 (74.8)	22.3 (72.1)	20.7 (69.3)	24.0 (75.2)
Mean daily minimum °C (°F)	17.9 (64.2)	18.2 (64.8)	19.6 (67.3)	21.5 (70.7)	22.5 (72.5)	22.8 (73.0)	22.6 (72.7)	22.7 (72.9)	22.0 (71.6)	21.3 (70.3)	20.4 (68.7)	18.9 (66.0)	20.9 (69.6)
Record low °C (°F)	11.6 (52.9)	11.9 (53.4)	12.7 (54.9)	15.1 (59.2)	18.4 (65.1)	18.3 (64.9)	18.6 (65.5)	19.1 (66.4)	18.5 (65.3)	15.4 (59.7)	13.9 (57.0)	12.8 (55.0)	11.6 (52.9)
Average precipitation mm (inches)	55.3 (2.18)	23.3 (0.92)	34.3 (1.35)	92.0 (3.62)	191.6 (7.54)	123.7 (4.87)	121.8 (4.80)	132.3 (5.21)	220.7 (8.69)	372.8 (14.68)	468.3 (18.44)	242.3 (9.54)	2,082.1 (81.97)
Average rainy days	12.9	7.1	5.9	8.2	16.9	15.2	16.0	18.1	21.6	22.1	21.3	20.4	185.7
Average relative humidity (%)	85.8	82.9	79.3	78.2	78.8	78.0	77.1	77.7	83.2	87.4	88.8	88.5	82.2
Mean monthly sunshine hours	141.6	182.5	241.4	245.4	236.2	207.1	210.8	198.0	172.6	140.3	101.0	96.4	2,172.1
Source: Vietnam Institute for Building Science and Technology
