= AD26 =

AD26 or variation, may refer to:

- AD 26, the 26th year after Jesus birth
- Ad26, adenovirus serotype 26, used for the creation of recombinant virus vectors (rAd26)
- USS Shenandoah (AD-26), WWII-era U.S. destroyer tender

== See also ==
- 26 Air Defence Regiment (India) (26.AD)
- Ad26.COV2.S, COVID-19 vaccine by Janssen Pharmaceutical (Johnson & Johnson)
- Ad26.ZEBOV, Ebola vaccine
- 26 (disambiguation)
- AD (disambiguation)
