= 26A (disambiguation) =

26A may refer to:

- 26A, the FAA location identifier for Ashland/Lineville Airport
- 26a, a 2005 book by Diana Evans
- Rainy Lake 26A, a First Nations reserve on Rainy Lake in Rainy River District, Ontario
- 26A Shed code for Newton Heath TMD 1935-1963

== See also ==
- 26 (disambiguation)
- A26 (disambiguation)
