= 26th Division =

26th Division may refer to:

== Infantry divisions ==
- 26th Division (National Revolutionary Army), Republic of China
- 26th Division (German Empire)
- 26th Landwehr Division, German Empire
- 26th Reserve Division, German Empire
- 26th Infantry Division (Wehrmacht), Germany
- 26th Waffen Grenadier Division of the SS (2nd Hungarian), Germany
- 26th Indian Infantry Division
- 26th Infantry Division "Assietta", Italy
- 26th Division (Imperial Japanese Army)
- 26th Infantry Division (Poland)
- 26th Infantry Division (Russian Empire)
- 26th Division (Somalia)
- 26th Division (Spain)
- 26th Mechanized Infantry Division (South Korea)
- 26th Guards Mechanized Division, Soviet Union
- 26th Guards Rifle Division, Soviet Union
- 26th Mechanized Division (Soviet Union)
- 26th Rifle Division, Soviet Union
- 26th Division (United Kingdom)
- 26th Infantry Division (United States)
- 26th Division (Yugoslav Partisans)

== Armoured divisions ==
- 26th Tank Division (People's Republic of China)
- 26th Panzer Division, Wehrmacht, Germany
- 26th Guards Tank Division, Soviet Union
- 26th Guards Tank Training Division, Soviet Union

== Aviation divisions ==
- 26th Air Division, United States

== Naval divisions ==
- 26th Naval River Ships Division, Ukraine

== See also ==
- List of military divisions by number
- 26th Army (disambiguation)
- XXVI Corps (disambiguation)
- 26th Brigade (disambiguation)
- 26th Regiment (disambiguation)
- 26th Battalion (disambiguation)
- 26th Squadron (disambiguation)
