= NS26 =

NS26, NS 26, NS-26, NS.26, or variation, may refer to:

== Places ==
- Raffles Place MRT station (station code: NS26), Downtown Core, Singapore; a mass transit station
- Halifax Armdale (constituency N.S. 26), Nova Scotia, Canada; a provincial electoral district

== Other uses ==
- New Penguin Shakespeare volume 26
- Blue Origin NS-26, a 29 August 2024 suborbital spaceflight
- White Pass NS #26, a railcar; see List of White Pass and Yukon Route locomotives and cars

== See also ==
- NS (disambiguation)
- 26 (disambiguation)
