= List of highways numbered 26 =

Route 26, or Highway 26, can refer to:

== International ==
- Asian Highway 26
- E26 European route E26

== Australia ==
- Burwood Highway
- Anzac Avenue

== Austria ==
- Linzer Autobahn

== Canada ==
- Alberta Highway 26
- British Columbia Highway 26
- Manitoba Highway 26
- Ontario Highway 26
- Prince Edward Island Route 26
- Saskatchewan Highway 26

== Czech Republic ==
- I/26 Highway; Czech: Silnice I/26

== Finland ==
- Finnish national road 26

== Greece ==
- EO26 road

== India ==
- National Highway 26 (India)

== Iran ==
- Road 26

== Ireland ==
- N26 road (Ireland)

== Italy ==
- Autostrada A26

== Japan ==
- Japan National Route 26
- Hanwa Expressway
- Kinki Expressway

== Korea, South ==
- National Route 26

== Malaysia ==
- South Klang Valley Expressway
- FT 26 KLIA Expressway

== Montenegro ==
- R-26 regional road (Montenegro)

== New Zealand ==
- New Zealand State Highway 26

== United Kingdom ==
- British A26 (Maidstone-Newhaven)
- British M26 (Chevening-Wrotham Heath)

== United States ==
- Interstate 26
- U.S. Route 26
  - U.S. Route 26N (former)
- New England Interstate Route 26 (former)
- Alabama State Route 26
  - County Route 26 (Lee County, Alabama)
- Arkansas Highway 26
- California State Route 26
  - California State Route 26 (1937–1964) (former)
  - County Route A26 (California)
  - County Route J26 (California)
  - County Route S26 (California)
- Colorado State Highway 26
- Delaware Route 26
- Florida State Road 26
- Georgia State Route 26
- Illinois Route 26
- Indiana State Road 26
- Iowa Highway 26
- K-26 (Kansas highway)
- Kentucky Route 26
- Louisiana Highway 26
- Maine State Route 26
- Maryland Route 26
  - Maryland Route 26C
  - Maryland Route 26D
  - Maryland Route 26E
  - Maryland Route 26F
- Massachusetts Route 26 (former)
- M-26 (Michigan highway)
- Minnesota State Highway 26
  - County Road 26 (Dakota County, Minnesota)
- Mississippi Highway 26
- Missouri Route 26 (1922) (former)
  - Missouri Route 26 (1926) (former)
  - Missouri Route 26 (1950s) (former)
- Nebraska Highway 26 (former)
  - Nebraska Spur 26B
  - Nebraska Spur 26E
- Nevada State Route 26 (former)
- New Hampshire Route 26
- New Jersey Route 26
  - County Route 26 (Bergen County, New Jersey)
- New Mexico State Road 26
- New York State Route 26
  - County Route 26E (Cayuga County, New York)
  - County Route 26 (Chenango County, New York)
  - County Route 26 (Clinton County, New York)
  - County Route 26 (Franklin County, New York)
  - County Route 26 (Greene County, New York)
  - County Route 26 (Herkimer County, New York)
  - County Route 26 (Jefferson County, New York)
  - County Route 26 (Livingston County, New York)
  - County Route 26 (Niagara County, New York)
  - County Route 26 (Ontario County, New York)
  - County Route 26 (Orange County, New York)
  - County Route 26 (Otsego County, New York)
  - County Route 26 (Rensselaer County, New York)
  - County Route 26 (Rockland County, New York)
  - County Route 26 (Schoharie County, New York)
  - County Route 26 (Schuyler County, New York)
  - County Route 26 (Steuben County, New York)
  - County Route 26 (Suffolk County, New York)
  - County Route 26 (Sullivan County, New York)
  - County Route 26 (Washington County, New York)
  - County Route 26 (Westchester County, New York)
  - County Route 26 (Wyoming County, New York)
- North Carolina Highway 26 (former)
- North Dakota Highway 26 (1926–1927) (former)
  - North Dakota Highway 26 (1927–1931) (former)
- Ohio State Route 26
- Oklahoma State Highway 26
- Oregon Route 26 (1932) (former)
- Pennsylvania Route 26
- South Carolina Highway 26 (1920s) (former)
  - South Carolina Highway 26 (1930s) (former)
- South Dakota Highway 26
- Tennessee State Route 26
- Texas State Highway 26
  - Texas State Highway Spur 26
  - Farm to Market Road 26
  - Texas Park Road 26 (former)
- Utah State Route 26
- Vermont Route 26
- Virginia State Route 26
  - Virginia State Route 26 (1918-1933) (former)
- Washington State Route 26
- West Virginia Route 26
- Wisconsin Highway 26
- Wyoming Highway 26

Territories

- Puerto Rico Highway 26

== Uruguay ==
- Route 26 Gral. Leandro Gómez

== See also ==
- List of A26 roads
- List of highways numbered 26A
- List of highways numbered 26B

Preceded by 25	Lists of highways 26	Succeeded by 27
