= 52nd Reserve Division =

52nd Reserve Division (52. Reserve-Division)
- Active: 1914-1919
- Country: Germany
- Branch: Army
- Type: Infantry
- Size: Approx. 15,000
- Engagements: World War I: Race to the Sea, Battle of the Yser, First Battle of Ypres, Battle of the Somme, Second Battle of the Aisne, Passchendaele

The 52nd Reserve Division (52. Reserve-Division) was a unit of the Imperial German Army in World War I. The division was formed in September 1914 and organized over the next month, arriving in the line in October. It was part of the first wave of new divisions formed at the outset of World War I, which were numbered the 43rd through 54th Reserve Divisions. The division was initially part of XXVI Reserve Corps. It was disbanded in 1919 during the demobilization of the German Army after World War I. The division was primarily recruited in the Grand Duchy of Baden and in the Prussian Rhine Province.

== Combat chronicle ==
The 52nd Reserve Division fought on the Western Front, entering the line in mid-October. As part of the so-called Race to the Sea, it fought in the Battle of the Yser and the First Battle of Ypres in October–November 1914. It remained in positional warfare and fighting along the Yser until September 1916. It saw action in the Battle of the Somme that month, and then went into the line in the Champagne region until April 1917. In May 1917, it fought in the Second Battle of the Aisne, also called the Third Battle of Champagne, and in the autumn of 1917 fought in the Battle of Passchendaele. The division then returned to the line in the Champagne, remaining there until April 1918. At the end of April it went into action in the fighting at Kemmel, Belgium, and then remained in the Flanders region until the end of the war. In 1918, Allied intelligence rated the division as a second class division, noting that although trained as an assault division, it was not so used in most of the German offensives that year.

== Order of battle on formation ==
The 52nd Reserve Division was initially organized as a square division, with essentially the same organization as the reserve divisions formed on mobilization. The order of battle of the 52nd Reserve Division on September 10, 1914, was as follows:

- 103.Reserve-Infanterie-Brigade
  - Reserve-Infanterie-Regiment Nr. 237
  - Reserve-Infanterie-Regiment Nr. 238
  - Reserve-Jäger-Bataillon Nr. 24
- 104.Reserve-Infanterie-Brigade
  - Reserve-Infanterie-Regiment Nr. 239
  - Reserve-Infanterie-Regiment Nr. 240
- Reserve-Kavallerie-Abteilung Nr. 52
- Reserve-Feldartillerie-Regiment Nr. 52
- Reserve-Pionier-Kompanie Nr. 52

== Order of battle on January 1, 1918 ==
The 52nd Reserve Division was triangularized in August 1916, dissolving the 103rd Reserve Infantry Brigade headquarters and sending the 237th Reserve Infantry Regiment to the 199th Infantry Division. Over the course of the war, other changes took place, including the formation of artillery and signals commands and the enlargement of combat engineer support to a full pioneer battalion. The order of battle on January 1, 1918, was as follows:

- 104.Reserve-Infanterie-Brigade
  - Reserve-Infanterie-Regiment Nr. 238
  - Reserve-Infanterie-Regiment Nr. 239
  - Reserve-Infanterie-Regiment Nr. 240
- Reserve-Kavallerie-Abteilung Nr. 52
- Artillerie-Kommandeur 69
  - Reserve-Feldartillerie-Regiment Nr. 52
  - Fußartillerie-Bataillon Nr. 51 (from August 8, 1918)
- Stab Pionier-Bataillon Nr. 352
  - 8./2. Brandenburgisches Pionier-Bataillon Nr. 28
  - Reserve-Pionier-Kompanie Nr. 52
  - Minenwerfer-Kompanie Nr. 252
- Divisions-Nachrichten-Kommandeur 452
