= Bielefeld Agreement =

The Bielefeld Agreement was an agreement during the Ruhr uprising of 1920 between the representatives of the Ruhr Red Army and the German government.

== Background ==
At the height of the conflict in the Ruhr, which had started due to the Kapp Putsch, the Ruhr Red Army was in control of the Ruhr area and the nearby areas. However, the differences among the participants were great. The central organ in Hagen was relatively moderate, whereas the central council in Mülheim was dominated by syndicalists. In Duisburg, anarchist forces took control and acted completely separately from any higher authorities. In general, in the east and south part of the Ruhr, the less radical Independent Social Democratic Party of Germany (USPD) was dominant, whereas in the west, syndicalists and communists were stronger.

The government in Berlin saw these internal differences as an opportunity. They wanted to drive a wedge between the various movements and thereby weaken the power of the movement as a whole.

== Negotiations and agreement ==
The representatives of the government were Post Minister Johannes Giesberts of the Centre Party and the Prussian agriculture minister Otto Braun of the Social Democratic Party of Germany (SPD). They held a conference on 23 — 24 March 1920 in Bielefeld. The other participants were the executive councils of the rebels, city governments, the regional presidents of the regions Düsseldorf, Münster and Arnsberg, the trade unions and the political parties from the political centre to the Communist Party of Germany (KPD). As Reichskommissar for the Ruhr, Carl Severing (SPD) also played a central role. He formulated the goal of the negotiations: to come to an understanding over disarming, and how this was to be organised. Whilst Braun and Giesberts tried to make as few concessions as possible, Severing kept to the 9-points-program, which the chairman of the Allgemeiner Deutscher Gewerkschaftsbund (General German Confederation of Trade Unions) Carl Legien had agreed with Friedrich Ebert, which provided for a strengthening of the political influence of the workers' movement in German politics.

In the end, a commission agreed on precisely that. The negotiated Bielefeld Agreement at first contained wording similar to an agreement reached a short while previously on a national level between trade unions and the government. It also contained certain specific points. It contained an amnesty for illegal acts which had been committed in the context of resistance to the Kapp Putsch. With respect to the disarmament, the negotiators agreed on cooperation between the local authorities and the workers' executive councils. Indeed, both were to cooperate, to set up republican defence forces. The government delegates agreed that, if these measures were complied with, the Ruhr would not be militarily occupied by the Reichswehr.

The agreement seemed a sensible attempt to end the conflict through peaceful means. In the end it came to a division of the rebels. The moderate forces including the USPD and the central body in Hagen supported the agreement. The central council in Essen and the KPD demanded new negotiations, whilst the radical executive councils of Mülheim and Hamborn rejected any settlement. The military leaders of the Red Ruhr Army took the same view. They preferred an "honourable downfall" to an apparently foul compromise.

== Failure and escalation ==
The demands for fresh negotiations might have been successful, had it not been for the increasingly chaotic situation in Duisburg. The Reich Cabinet under Hermann Müller broke away from the agreement and set an ultimatum. The regional military commander Generalleutnant Oskar von Watter then tightened the provisions of this ultimatum regarding the surrender of weapons so much so that it was not even technically possible for the rebels to comply with them, even though they were willing to do so. The behaviour of Watter illustrates one central weakness of the Bielefeld Agreement: as the military was not included in the agreement, and was also not as a whole effectively controlled by the government, it could act on its own initiative. The consequence of Watter's ultimatum was the proclamation of a general strike by the Essen central council. This was answered, after 29 March, by about three quarters of the miners of the area. The military, above all the semi-official Freikorps, suppressed the revolt subsequently with brutal violence. The Bielefeld Agreement therefore had, ultimately, no effect at all.
