= List of A26 roads =

This is a list of roads designated A26. Roads entries are sorted in the countries alphabetical order.

- A26 motorway (Austria), a planned road (Linzerautobahn)
- A26 road (England), a road connecting Maidstone, Kent and Newhaven, East Sussex
- A26 motorway (France), a road connecting Calais and Troyes
- A 26 motorway (Germany), a road connecting Lower Saxony and Hamburg
- A26 road (Isle of Man), a road connecting Ballasalla and Glen Vine
- A26 motorway (Italy), a road connecting Genoa and the mouth of the Val d’Ossola
- A26 road (Northern Ireland), a road connecting Coleraine, County Londonderry and Banbridge, County Down
- A-26 motorway (Spain), a road connecting the French border near Portbou and Sabiñánigo, Aragón
- A 26 road (Sri Lanka), a road connecting Kandy and Padiyathalawa

== See also ==
- List of highways numbered 26
