= A26 =

A26 or A-26 may refer to:

== Roads ==
- List of A26 roads

== Transportation ==
- Douglas A-26 Invader, a light attack bomber built by Douglas
- Aero A.26, a Czech reconnaissance aircraft of the 1920s
- Focke-Wulf A 26, a German Focke-Wulf aircraft
- Tachikawa Ki-77, a Japanese experimental aircraft, which went by the civilian name A-26
- Blekinge-class submarine, also known as the A26 submarine, the next generation of Swedish submarines equipped with stirling engines
- Adin Airport (FAA location identifier A26)

== Media and entertainment ==
- Samsung Galaxy A26, an Android-based smartphone by Samsung Electronics

== Other uses ==
- HLA-A26, an HLA-A serotype
- The English Opening, in the Encyclopaedia of Chess Openings
- The file extension for Starpath Supercharger cassette images
