= M'Drắk =

M'Drắk Xã M'Drắk
- Commune
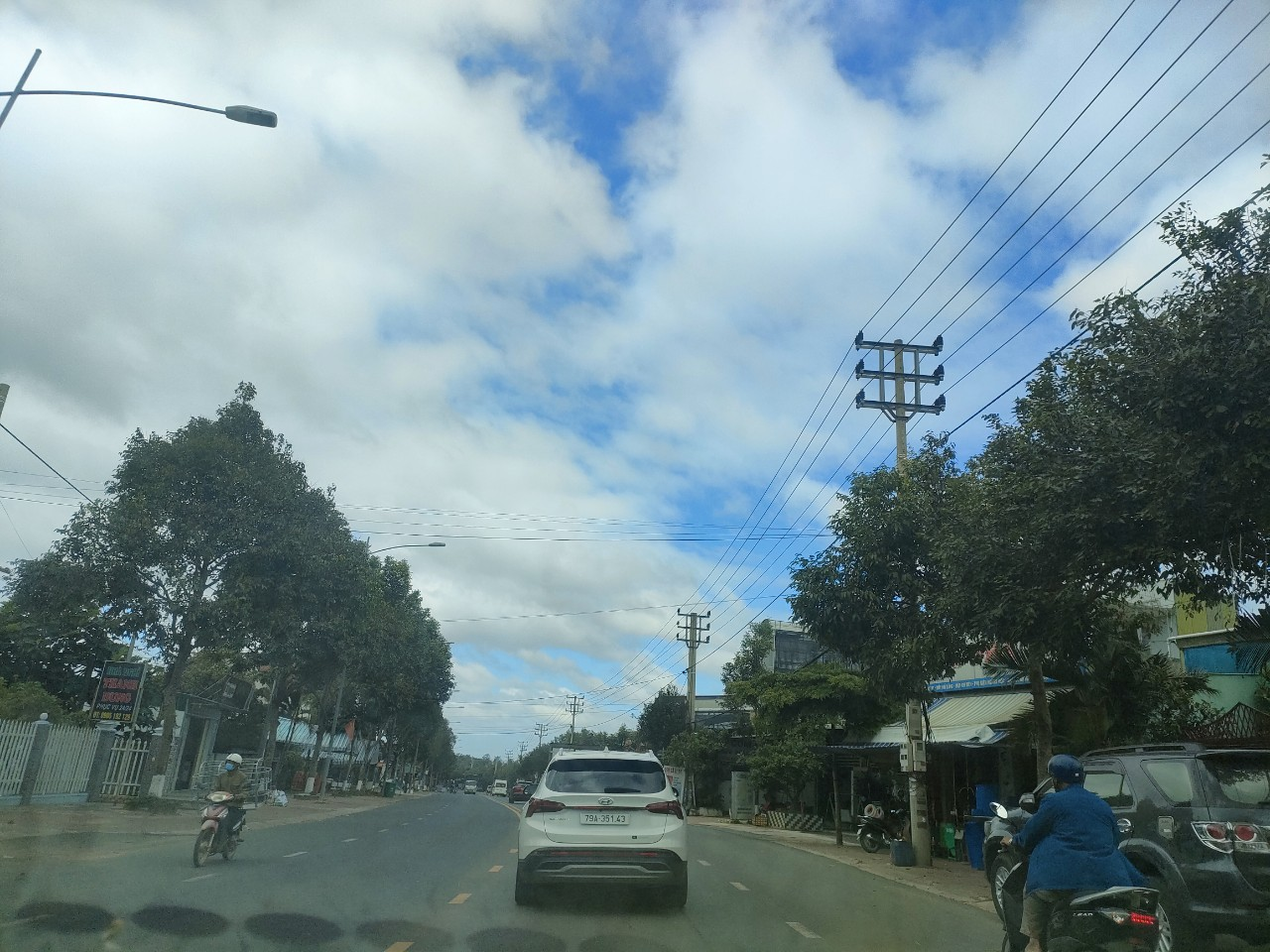
- National Route 26, passing through M'Drắk

- Location within Vietnam
- Coordinates: 12°45′12″N 108°44′18″E
- Country: Vietnam
- Region: Central Highlands
- Province: Đắk Lắk
- Established: 16/6/2025

Area
  - Total: 58.64 sq mi (151.87 km^{2})

Population (2025)
  - Total: 22,808
- Time zone: UTC+7 (UTC + 7)

M'Drắk is a commune (xã) of Đắk Lắk Province in the Central Highlands region of Vietnam.
