= Twenty-sixth of the month =

Recurring ordinal calendar date

The twenty-sixth of the month or twenty-sixth day of the month is the recurring calendar date position corresponding to the day numbered 26 of each month. In the Gregorian calendar (and other calendars that number days sequentially within a month), this day occurs in every month of the year, and therefore occurs twelve times per year.

- Twenty-sixth of January
- Twenty-sixth of February
- Twenty-sixth of March
- Twenty-sixth of April
- Twenty-sixth of May
- Twenty-sixth of June
- Twenty-sixth of July
- Twenty-sixth of August
- Twenty-sixth of September
- Twenty-sixth of October
- Twenty-sixth of November
- Twenty-sixth of December

In addition to these dates, this date occurs in months of many other calendars, such as the Bengali calendar and the Hebrew calendar.

== See also ==
- 26th (disambiguation)
