= List of highways numbered 26A =

The following highways are numbered 26A:

== United States ==
- Florida State Road 26A
  - County Road 26A (Alachua County, Florida)
- Maine State Route 26A
- Maryland Route 26A
- Nebraska Spur 26A
- New Jersey Route 26A (former)
- New York State Route 26A (former)
  - County Route 26A (Columbia County, New York)
  - County Route 26A (Greene County, New York)
  - County Route 26A (Ulster County, New York)
- Utah State Route 26A (former)

Preceded by 26	Lists of highways sharing the same number 26A	Succeeded by 26B
