= 26 Air Defence Regiment (India) =

- Active: 1941 – present
- Country: India
- Allegiance: British India; India
- Branch: British Indian Army; Indian Army
- Type: Corps of Army Air Defence
- Size: Regiment
- Colors: Sky Blue and Red

Insignia
- Abbreviation: 26 AD Regt

26 Air Defence Regiment is an Air Defence regiment of the Indian Army.

== Formation ==
26 Air Defence Regiment was raised on 1 October 1941 at Drigh Road, Karachi as the 2nd Indian Light Anti-Aircraft Regiment under Lt Col EC Kensington, RA.

== History ==
World War II
On 1 August 1942, the Regiment joined the Eastern Army and was deployed in Bengal and Assam. From November 1943 to December 1945, the Regiment was placed under Gen Slim's XIV Army under the IV Corps and was the only Air Defence Regiment to enter Rangoon after its capture. Havildar Surat Singh won the Indian Distinguished Service Medal.

Partition of India
In 1947–48, a train carrying refugees from Nizamuddin to Attari was attacked by a mob near Ludhiana. Maj Gurcharan Singh and Naib Subedar Dhan Singh displayed courage of the higher order and protected the refugees. For their bravery, they were awarded the Ashoka Chakra, Class II and Ashoka Chakra, Class III respectively.

Hyderabad Police Action (1948)
The Regiment participated in the annexation of the state of Hyderabad into the Indian Union.

Sino-Indian War
The Regiment was deployed in the Eastern Theatre. In addition to its Air Defence role, detachments of the Regiment were deployed in infantry role in Tawang and Senge of Arunachal Pradesh.

Indo-Pak War (1965)
The Regiment was deployed in the Eastern theatre, where 6 F-86s were engaged and 2 were shot down.

Indo-Pakistani War of 1971
The Regiment was deployed in the Punjab sector and shot down 7 aircraft. The Regiment was awarded 1 Vir Chakra, 1 Shaurya Chakra, 1 Vishisht Seva Medal, 1 Sena Medal and 2 Mention in Despatches.

Other Achievements

- The Regiment was awarded the Director General Army Air Defence's (DGAAD) unit appreciation award in 2005, 2011 and 2015. It has also been awarded 11 COAS Commendation Cards and 18 GOC-in-C Commendation Cards.
- 2 offices from the unit went on to become the Director General of Army Air Defence – Lt Gen KS Dogra AVSM*, VSM, ADC and Lt Gen Ram Pratap PVSM, VSM, ADC.
