= List of highways numbered 26B =

The following highways are numbered 26B:

== India ==
- National Highway 26B

== United States ==
- Nebraska Spur 26B
- New York State Route 26B (former)

| Preceded by 26A | Lists of highways sharing the same number 26B | Succeeded by 27 |
