= 26th Tank Division (People's Republic of China) =

26th Tank Division (1950.8-52.4)
- Country: China
- Type: Amphibious Armored
- Garrison/HQ: Kaifeng, Henan province
- Engagements: Korean War

The 26th Tank Division(Chinese: 战车第26师, note the word "战车" instead of "坦克" adapted since 1953) was formed on August 30, 1950, consisting of 51st, 52nd and 53rd Amphibious Tank Regiments.

Its equipment were mainly captured NRA LVT-4 amphibious tanks during the 1949 Shanghai Campaign.

From March 1951, 53rd Tank Regiment entered Korea as a part of People's Volunteer Army without its equipment. During the Korean War the 53rd were in charge of repairing disabled and deserted enemy tanks and armored vehicles.

In April 1952 the division was disbanded:

- Division HQ, along with HQ, 184th Division and 52nd Tank Regiment became 2nd Tank School;
- 51st Tank Regiment, inheriting all the LVT-4s and nearly all the crews, was put under direct control Eastern China Military Region.
- 53rd Tank Regiment was renamed as 6th Independent Tank Regiment.
