= Twenty-sixth Amendment =

The Twenty-sixth Amendment may refer to the:

- Twenty-sixth Amendment to the United States Constitution — provides that the right to vote may not be denied on account of age, by any state or by the United States, to any American citizen age 18 or older.
- Twenty-sixth Amendment of the Constitution of Ireland — permitted the state to ratify the Nice Treaty.
- Twenty-sixth Amendment of the Constitution of India — 28 December 1971, abolition of privy purse paid to former rulers of princely states which were incorporated into the Indian Republic
- Twenty-sixth Amendment to the Constitution of Pakistan
