= Oskar von Watter =

German general

Oskar Freiherr von Watter
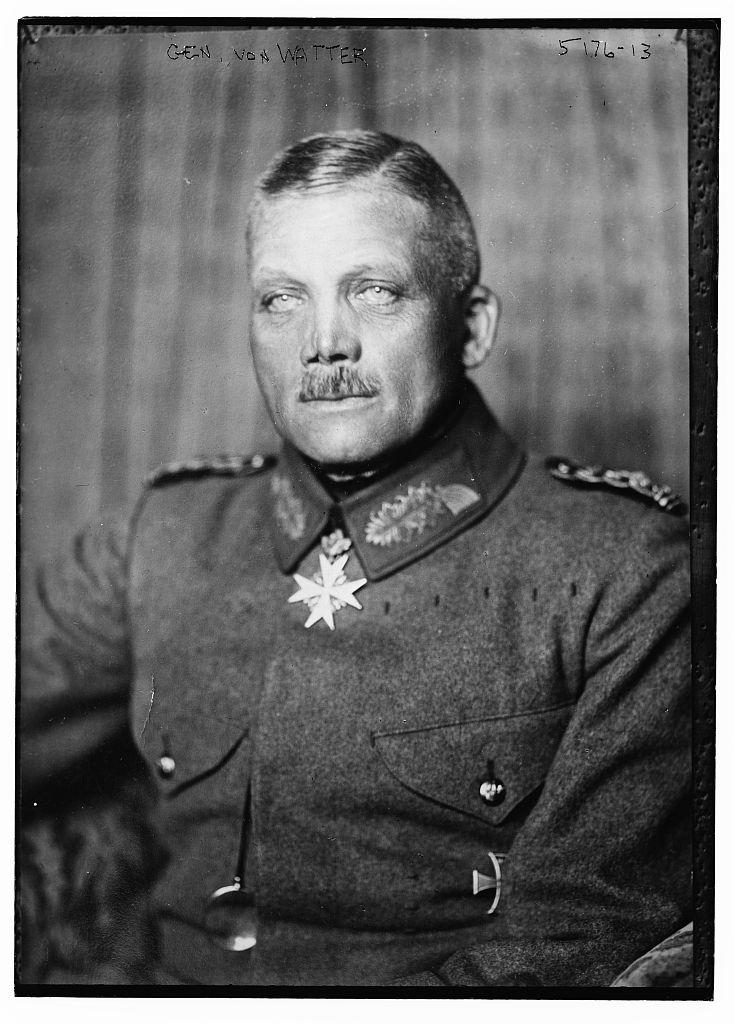
- Born: 2 September 1861; Ludwigsburg, Kingdom of Württemberg
- Died: 23 August 1939 (aged 77); Berlin, Germany
- Military career
- Allegiance: German Empire; Weimar Republic
- Branch: Imperial German Army; Reichsheer
- Service years: 1879–1920
- Rank: Generalleutnant
- Commands: 34th (2nd Lotharingian) Field Artillery; 10th Field Artillery Brigade; 54th Infantry Division; XXVI Reserve Corps
- Conflicts: World War I Ruhr Uprising
- Awards: Pour le Mérite with Oakleaves

Oskar Walther Gerhard Julius Freiherr von Watter (2 September 1861 – 23 August 1939) was a German Generalleutnant who served in World War I and led the suppression of the Ruhr Uprising.

== Early life ==
Oskar Walther Gerhard Julius Freiherr von Watter was born on 2 September 1861 in Ludwigsburg, into an old Pomeranian noble family. His father Karl von Watter was an officer of the Württemberg Army, and his mother Emma (née Deyhle) was the daughter of a factory owner. Von Watter joined the Württemberg Army in 1879 with the rank of Leutnant and assigned to an artillery regiment in Ulm. He graduated from the Prussian Staff College in 1888

== World War I ==
In April 1913, von Watter took over the command of the 10th Brigade of Field Artillery, with the rank of generalmajor, which he kept until 3 March 1915. With that force, General von Watter took part in the early fighting of World War I in France. Subsequently, he took over the 54th Infantry Division, which he commanded until 5 March 1918. The division was initially also deployed in France, but it was later sent to fight on the eastern front by the River Narew, and from September 1915, he was again at the western front. On 23 December 1917, he was awarded the Pour le Mérite for military bravery. Until 11 November 1918, he was commander of the XXVI Reserve Corps. On 3 November 1918, a few days before the end of the war, he was awarded the oak leaves of the "Pour le Mérite" (signifying a second award).

== Post-war ==
In March 1920, von Watter was in command of Military District VII stationed at Münster during lead-up to the Ruhr uprising, an attempt by far left workers to set up a soviet-style council republic in Germany. After the government in Berlin had negotiated the Bielefeld Agreement to end the uprising, von Watter, without consulting Berlin, added conditions that could not be met. The workers responded with a general strike, and on 2 April, the government ordered units of the Reichswehr and Freikorps under the command of von Watter into the Ruhr area. There were mass arrests and shootings, including of wounded fighters. Fifty had been executed and an additional 205 condemned by drumhead courts before the government in Berlin forbade them on 3 April. Von Watter defended himself from other charges that his men had engaged in unlawful behaviour by citing a letter from the Ministry of the Reichswehr that stated, "You are given complete freedom to do what the situation demands". The uprising left over 1,000 workers and 600 Reichswehr and Freikorps soldiers dead.

On his initiative, to the south of Horst Castle, in Essen in 1934 a monument was erected in memory of the Freikorps soldiers who died in 1920 during the suppression of the Ruhr uprising.

Von Watter died on 23 August 1939 in Berlin and was buried in the Invalids' Cemetery.
