= Adin Airport =

Airport in California, United States

- IATA: none; ICAO: none; FAA LID: A26

Summary
- Airport type: Public
- Owner: County of Modoc
- Serves: Adin, California
- Elevation AMSL: 4,229 ft (1,289 m)
- Coordinates: 41°11′11″N 120°57′16″W
- Interactive map of Adin Airport

Runways
Direction	Length		Surface
Direction	ft	m	Surface
9/27	2,850	869	Asphalt

Statistics (2009)
- Aircraft operations: 200
- Source: Federal Aviation Administration

Adin Airport (FAA LID: A26) is a county-owned public-use airport located one nautical mile (1.85 km) southwest of the central business district of Adin, an unincorporated community in Modoc County, California, United States.

== Facilities and aircraft ==
Adin Airport covers an area of 110 acres (45 ha) at an elevation of 4,229 feet (1,289 m) above mean sea level. It has one runway designated 9/27 with an asphalt surface measuring 2,850 by 40 feet (869 x 12 m). For the 12-month period ending December 31, 2009, the airport had 200 general aviation aircraft operations, an average of 16 per month.
