= Cư M'ta =

- Commune
- Location within Vietnam
- Coordinates: 12°45′23.27″N 108°47′13.46″E
- Country: Vietnam
- Region: Central Highlands
- Province: Đắk Lắk

Population (2007)
  - Total: 2,936
- Time zone: UTC+07:00 (Indochina Time)

Cư M'ta is a commune (xã) in Đắk Lắk Province, Vietnam. As of 2007, the commune had a population of 2,936. Agricultural land area amounts to 1433.98 hectares with 16,152.39 hectares of natural forests of which 1319.38 hectares is protected.

The whole commune has 612 households and communal food production in 2007 amounted to 1424 tons.

On June 16, 2025, the Standing Committee of the National Assembly issued Resolution No. 1660/NQ-UBTVQH15 on the reorganization of commune-level administrative units in Đắk Lắk Province in 2025 (the resolution took effect on the date of its adoption). Accordingly, the entire natural area and population of Cư Króa Commune and Cư M’ta Commune were consolidated to establish a new commune named Cư M’ta Commune.
