= XXVI Reserve Corps =

WWI army unit

XXVI Reserve Corps XXVI. Reserve-Korps
- Flag of the Staff of a Generalkommando (1871–1918)
- Active: October 1914 - post November 1918
- Country: German Empire
- Type: Corps
- Size: Approximately 32,000 (on formation)
- Engagements: World War I Western Front First Battle of Ypres

Insignia
- Abbreviation: XXVI RK

The XXVI Reserve Corps (German: XXVI. Reserve-Korps / XXVI RK) was a corps-level command of the German army during World War I.

== Formation ==
XXVI Reserve Corps was formed in October 1914. It was part of the first wave of new Corps formed at the outset of World War I consisting of XXII - XXVII Reserve Corps of 43rd - 54th Reserve Divisions (plus 6th Bavarian Reserve Division). The personnel was predominantly made up of kriegsfreiwillige (wartime volunteers) who did not wait to be called up. It was still in existence at the end of the war in the 18th Army, Heeresgruppe Deutscher Kronprinz on the Western Front.

=== Structure on formation ===
On formation in October 1914, XXVI Reserve Corps consisted of two divisions. but was weaker than an Active Corps

- Reserve Infantry Regiments consisted of three battalions but only had a machine gun platoon (of 2 machine guns) rather than a machine gun company (of 6 machine guns)
- Reserve Jäger Battalions did not have a machine gun company on formation, though some were provided with a machine gun platoon
- Reserve Cavalry Detachments were much smaller than the Reserve Cavalry Regiments formed on mobilisation
- Reserve Field Artillery Regiments consisted of three abteilungen (2 gun and 1 howitzer) of three batteries each, but each battery had just 4 guns (rather than 6 of the Active and the Reserve Regiments formed on mobilisation)

In summary, XXVI Reserve Corps mobilised with 26 infantry battalions, 8 machine gun platoons (16 machine guns), 2 cavalry detachments, 18 field artillery batteries (72 guns) and 2 pioneer companies.

Corps	Division	Brigade	Units
XXVI Reserve Corps	51st Reserve Division	101st Reserve Infantry Brigade	233rd Reserve Infantry Regiment
XXVI Reserve Corps	51st Reserve Division	101st Reserve Infantry Brigade	234th Reserve Infantry Regiment
XXVI Reserve Corps	51st Reserve Division	102nd Reserve Infantry Brigade	235th Reserve Infantry Regiment
XXVI Reserve Corps	51st Reserve Division	102nd Reserve Infantry Brigade	236th Reserve Infantry Regiment
XXVI Reserve Corps	51st Reserve Division		23rd Reserve Jäger Battalion
XXVI Reserve Corps	51st Reserve Division		51st Reserve Field Artillery Regiment
XXVI Reserve Corps	51st Reserve Division		51st Reserve Cavalry Detachment
XXVI Reserve Corps	51st Reserve Division		51st Reserve Pioneer Company
XXVI Reserve Corps	52nd Reserve Division	103rd Reserve Infantry Brigade	237th Reserve Infantry Regiment
XXVI Reserve Corps	52nd Reserve Division	103rd Reserve Infantry Brigade	238th Reserve Infantry Regiment
XXVI Reserve Corps	52nd Reserve Division	104th Reserve Infantry Brigade	239th Reserve Infantry Regiment
XXVI Reserve Corps	52nd Reserve Division	104th Reserve Infantry Brigade	240th Reserve Infantry Regiment
XXVI Reserve Corps	52nd Reserve Division		24th Reserve Jäger Battalion
XXVI Reserve Corps	52nd Reserve Division		52nd Reserve Field Artillery Regiment
XXVI Reserve Corps	52nd Reserve Division		52nd Reserve Cavalry Detachment
XXVI Reserve Corps	52nd Reserve Division		52nd Reserve Pioneer Company

== Commanders ==
XXVI Reserve Corps had the following commanders during its existence:

From	Rank	Name
25 August 1914	Generalleutnant	Otto von Hügel
30 September 1914	General der Infanterie	Otto von Hügel
5 March 1918	Generalleutnant	Oskar von Watter

== See also ==
- German Army order of battle, Western Front (1918)

== Bibliography ==
- Cron, Hermann (2002). Imperial German Army 1914-18: Organisation, Structure, Orders-of-Battle [first published: 1937]. Helion & Co. ISBN 1-874622-70-1.
- Ellis, John; Cox, Michael (1993). The World War I Databook. Aurum Press Ltd. ISBN 1-85410-766-6.
- Busche, Hartwig (1998). Formationsgeschichte der Deutschen Infanterie im Ersten Weltkrieg (1914 bis 1918) (in German). Institut für Preußische Historiographie.
- Histories of Two Hundred and Fifty-One Divisions of the German Army which Participated in the War (1914-1918), compiled from records of Intelligence section of the General Staff, American Expeditionary Forces, at General Headquarters, Chaumont, France 1919. The London Stamp Exchange Ltd. 1989 [1920]. ISBN 0-948130-87-3.
- The German Forces in the Field; 7th Revision, 11th November 1918; Compiled by the General Staff, War Office. Imperial War Museum, London and the Battery Press. 1995 [1918]. ISBN 978-1-870423-95-3.
