= 26 Squadron =

26 Squadron may refer to:

- No. 26 Squadron PAF
- No. 26 Squadron RAF
- No. 26 Squadron RAAF
- No. 26 Squadron SAAF
