= 26th Battalion =

26th Battalion may refer to:

- 26th Battalion (Australia), a World War I ANZAC battalion
- 2/26th Battalion (Australia), a World War II Australian infantry battalion
- 26th Battalion (New Brunswick), CEF, a World War I battalion for the Canadian Corps
- 26th Battalion (New Zealand), a World War II infantry battalion

== See also ==
- 26th Division (disambiguation)
- 26th Brigade (disambiguation)
- 26th Regiment (disambiguation)
