= 26th Brigade =

26th Brigade or 26th Infantry Brigade may refer to:

== Australia ==
- 26th Brigade (Australia)

== Germany ==
- 26th Airborne Brigade (Bundeswehr)

== India ==
- 26th Indian Infantry Brigade

== Indonesia ==
- 26th Infantry Brigade (Indonesia)

== Italy ==
- XXVI Infantry Brigade

== Russia ==
- 26th Rocket Brigade

== Ukraine ==
- 26th Artillery Brigade (Ukraine)
- 26th Road Restoration Brigade (Ukraine)

== United Kingdom ==
- 26th (London) Anti-Aircraft Brigade
- 26th Armoured Brigade (United Kingdom)
- 26th Infantry Brigade (United Kingdom)
- 26th Reserve Brigade
- 26th Brigade Royal Field Artillery
- 26th (Highland) Pack Brigade, Royal Garrison Artillery

== United States ==
- 26th Maneuver Enhancement Brigade

== See also ==
- 26th Division (disambiguation)
- 26th Regiment (disambiguation)
- 26th Battalion (disambiguation)
- 26 Squadron (disambiguation)
