= 26 =

26 may refer to:

- 26 (number), the natural number following 25 and preceding 27
- one of the years 26 BC, AD 26, 1926, 2026

== Bands and songs ==
- 26 (band), an Australian alternative rock group
- "26", a 2014 song by Catfish and the Bottlemen from The Balcony
- "26", a 2022 song by Lauv from All 4 Nothing
- "26", a 2017 song by Paramore from the album After Laughter
- "Twenty Six", a 1999 song by Karma to Burn from the album Wild, Wonderful Purgatory

== Science ==
- Iron, a transition metal in the periodic table
- 26 Proserpina, an asteroid in the asteroid belt

== Other uses ==
- Twenty-Six (novel), a 2003 novel by Leo McKay Jr.
- XXVI Holdings, a subsidiary company of Alphabet Inc.
- Republic of Ireland, referring to the twenty six counties that consist of the country
- Tatra 26, a 6x4 automobile
- A Taiwanese internet slang for people from mainland China, sometimes used in a derogatory way. See 阿陸仔
- iOS 26, an operating system by Apple

== See also ==
- 26th (disambiguation)
