= 26th Regiment =

26th Regiment may refer to:

== Infantry regiments ==
- 26th (Cameronian) Regiment of Foot, a unit of the British Army
- 26th Regiment of Bombay Infantry, a unit of the British Army
- 26th Punjabis, a unit of the British Army
- 26th Infantry Regiment (United States), a unit of the United States Army
- 26th Infantry Regiment "Bergamo", a unit of the Italian Army
- 26th Marine Regiment (United States), a unit of the United States Marine Corps
- 26th Indiana Infantry Regiment, a unit of the United States Army
- 26th Regiment Infantry U.S. Colored Troops, a unit of the United States Army
- 26th Arkansas Infantry Regiment, a unit of the Confederate States Army
- 26th Continental Regiment, a unit of the United States Army
- 26th North Carolina Infantry, a unit of the United States Army
- 26th Regiment Kentucky Volunteer Infantry, a unit of the United States Army
- 26th Regiment Massachusetts Volunteer Infantry, a unit of the United States Army
- 26th Michigan Volunteer Infantry Regiment, a unit of the United States Army
- 26th Illinois Volunteer Infantry Regiment, a unit of the United States Army

== Cavalry regiments ==
- 26th Cavalry Regiment (Philippine Scouts), a unit of the United States Army
- 26th Cavalry (United States, 1963–1988), a parent regiment of the United States Army National Guard

== Armoured regiments ==
- 26th Tank Regiment, a unit of the Russian Army

== Engineering regiments ==
- 26 Engineer Regiment (United Kingdom), a unit of the British Army's Royal Engineers

== Artillery regiments ==
- 26th Field Artillery Regiment (Canada), a unit of the Canadian Army
- 26th Regiment Royal Artillery, a unit of the British Army's Royal Artillery
- 26th Field Artillery Regiment (United States), a unit of the United States Army
