= Paul Merker =

East German politician (1894-1969)

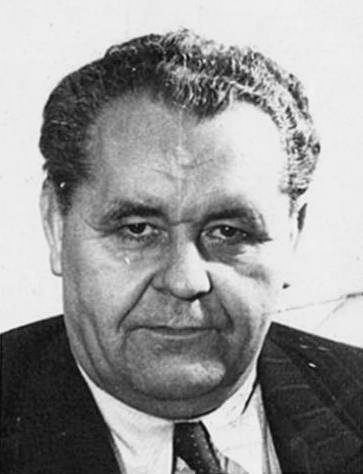
- Stasi photograph of Merker issued with his arrest warrant, 1952

Secretary for Agriculture of the Party Executive Central Secretariat
- In office 23 April 1946 – 22 August 1950
- Chairman: Wilhelm Pieck; Otto Grotewohl; Walter Ulbricht
- Preceded by: Position established
- Succeeded by: Kurt Vieweg

Secretary for Health Policy of the Party Executive Central Secretariat
- In office 23 April 1946 – 24 January 1949 Serving with Helmut Lehmann
- Chairman: Wilhelm Pieck; Otto Grotewohl
- Preceded by: Position established
- Succeeded by: Paul Wessel

Secretary for Labor and Social Welfare of the Party Executive Central Secretariat
- In office 23 April 1946 – 24 January 1949 Serving with Helmut Lehmann
- Chairman: Wilhelm Pieck; Otto Grotewohl
- Preceded by: Position established
- Succeeded by: Helmut Lehmann

National Leader of the Revolutionäre Gewerkschafts Opposition
- In office December 1929 – May 1930
- Preceded by: Position established
- Succeeded by: Fritz Emrich
Parliamentary constituencies
Member of the Provisional Volkskammer
In office 18 March 1948 – 19 October 1950
Preceded by	Constituency established
Succeeded by	Multi-member district
Member of the Landtag of Brandenburg
In office 22 November 1946 – 7 July 1950
Preceded by	Constituency established
Succeeded by	Multi-member district
Member of the Landtag of Prussia for Düsseldorf East
In office 5 January 1925 – 25 May 1932
Preceded by	Multi-member district
Succeeded by	Multi-member district

Personal details
- Born: 1 February 1894 Oberlößnitz, Kingdom of Saxony, German Empire
- Died: 13 May 1969 (aged 75) Eichwalde, Bezirk Potsdam, East Germany
- Party: USPD (1918–1920); KPD (1920–1946); SED (1946–1950, after 1956)
- Spouse: Margarete
- Occupation: Politician; Trade Unionist; Party Functionary

Military service
- Allegiance: German Empire
- Branch/service: Imperial German Army
- Years of service: 1914–1918
- Unit: Luftstreitkräfte
- Battles/wars: World War I; Eastern Front
- Central institution membership: 1949–1950: Full member, Politburo of the Central Committee; 1946–1950: Full member, Central Committee; 1935–1939: Full member, KPD Politburo; 1928–1930: Candidate member, KPD Politburo; 1927–1930, 1934–1945: Full member, KPD Central Committee

Paul Merker (1 February 1894 – 13 May 1969) was a German trade unionist and politician of the Communist Party of Germany (KPD) who later became a leading official of East Germany's ruling Socialist Unity Party of Germany (SED).

Merker featured for several years in the show trial culture of the time, placed under a lengthy investigation process that formally began in 1950, and jailed for eight years as a spy in 1955. Released less than a year later, he appeared as a reluctant witness against his friend Walter Janka at another show trial in 1957.

== Biography ==
=== Early years ===
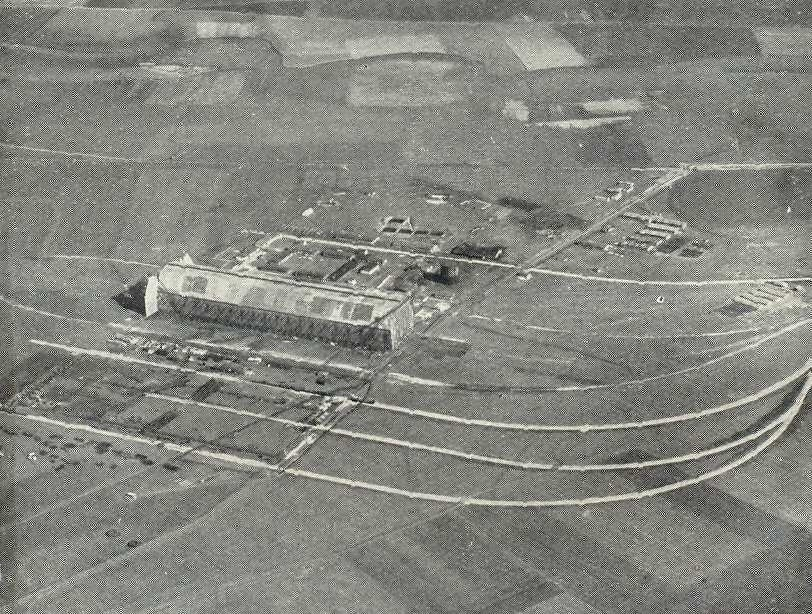
The airship hall at Yambol where the German Empire operated a military base during the First World War, and where Paul Merker served as a soldier.

Paul Merker was born near Meissen in Kingdom of Saxony, in what was then the stand-alone municipality of Oberlößnitz on 1 February 1894. In 1934, however, Oberlößnitz was subsumed into Radebeul. Born into a Protestant family, after leaving school Merker worked as a waiter and as a hotel worker. He was still working as a wine waiter, by now in Hamburg, in 1923.

He was a member of a Christian trades union from 1912 till 1918, before joining a "Free" (i.e. more expressly socialist) trades union from 1919. Between 1914 and 1918 he was stationed a soldier at Sandhofen (Mannheim) and then in the air-ship section at Yambol (in Bulgaria), where the Germans maintained an air-ship base for surveillance and with a view to bombing targets in Russia, Rumania and Sudan. While serving in the military Merker was arrested and imprisoned for six months for distributing (presumably subversive) leaflets.

=== Trades union activity and left-wing politics ===
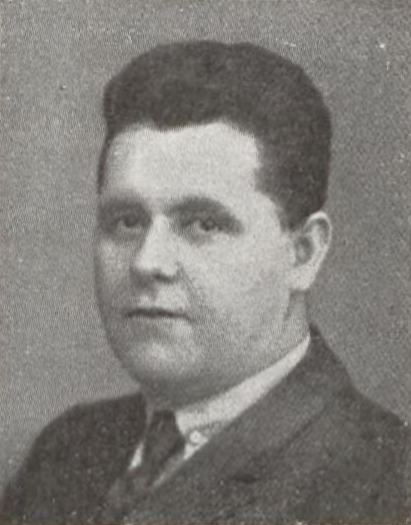
Merker's official Landtag portrait, 1925

In 1918 he joined the Independent Social Democratic Party of Germany (USPD), and in 1920 he joined the Communist Party of Germany (KPD). Until 1922 he worked as a trades union official.

Between 1923 and 1924 he served as the KPD regional secretary for the West Saxony district, and from 1924 till 1932 he was a deputy in the Prussian regional legislative assembly. From 1927 till 1930, and again between 1934 and 1945, he was a member of the KPD Central Committee and Politburo. As before, during the later 1920s the focus of his work was on the trades union section of the party. From 1929 he held the position of National Leader of Revolutionary Trades Union opposition RGO".

Merker was dismissed from the Central Committee and Politburo in April 1930 on account of his "extremist left-wing deviations" ("linksopportunistischer Abweichungen"). This happened after criticism from the influential Central Committee member Hermann Remmele, published in "Die Internationale", of the "ultra-left excesses of Social fascism" which Merker represented. He was also obliged to surrender his leadership of the RGO in favour of Fritz Emrich. Merker now occupied second tier positions in the party and in 1931 was made available to the Communist International, which prepared the way for a period working outside Germany.

=== The United States, the Soviet Union, and a return to the party ===
Between March 1931 and May 1933 Merker's services were contracted to the Comintern. He worked in the United States, using the cover name "Max Fischer", as an advisor to the Communist Party there. In the summer of 1933 he relocated to Leningrad. At the start of 1934 he returned to Germany to work illegally, and resumed active membership of the (by now illegal) Revolutionary Trades Union opposition (RGO)". Between 1934 and 1935 he was a member of the illegal Berlin regional leadership of the Communist Party in succession to Philipp Daub. Between 1935 and 1939 Merker was again elected to the KPD Central Committee and Politburo although the party itself had been banned in Germany since 1933.

=== France ===
After a wave of arrests started in 1935 the Communists made no attempt to create a new leadership structure within the German borders. From February 1937 Paul Merker was a member of the Central Committee of the (German) KPD which was now operating from Paris, taking responsibility for party operations in all the countries where party members were no longer able to operate. The Paris-based leadership was therefore also carrying out functions on behalf of The Party within Germany. After Walter Ulbricht left Paris, Paul Merker was briefly heading up the party secretariat alone, before July 1938 after which he did the work in partnership with Franz Dahlem.

Immediately after the Second World War began, the Paris-based party secretariat made an application for legitimization on behalf of the communist emigrants living illegally in France, in order that these might register with the French authorities. The decision to do this formed an important strand in the criminal investigation which was launched against Merker in 1952 and ensuing show trial of 1955, because for many of the affected emigrants it led to immediate internment which was frequently followed, once France had come under German occupation in 1940, by transfer to a concentration camp and, not infrequently, early death. Merker himself was interned in 1940 and sent, initially, to Camp Vernet, west of Perpignan, and which was now operating as a concentration camp. Here he remained till February 1941 when he was transferred to the internment camp at Les Milles, not far from Marseille. At Les Milles he was permitted to leave the camp during the daytime.

Returning to the camp on the evening of 1 July 1941, Merker was intercepted by a fellow Communist detainee, Fritz Fränken, who informed him of a threat to hand him over to the Gestapo. Merker, together with Walter Janka, Otto Wahls and Georg Stibi now disappeared underground.

=== Mexico ===
In June 1942, with help from Noel Field, he managed to escape from Marseille to Mexico which was becoming home to a considerable number of exiled German communists at this time. Here he occupied himself as secretary to the Latin-American Committee of the "Free Germany" ("Freies Deutschland") movement, regularly producing articles for the Freies Deutschland News sheet.

Merker benefitted from the assistance of Mexican diplomats, especially, the Mexican consul-general, Gilberto Bosques, to escape.

Merker spoke up, in particular, for a comprehensive compensation package for Jewish survivors of Nazi anti-semitic policies: "If all German rivers ran with ink, and all German forest were made of quill pens, there still would not be enough of either to describe sufficiently the numberless crimes that the Hitler Fascism has committed on the Jewish population."

=== Back to (East) Germany ===
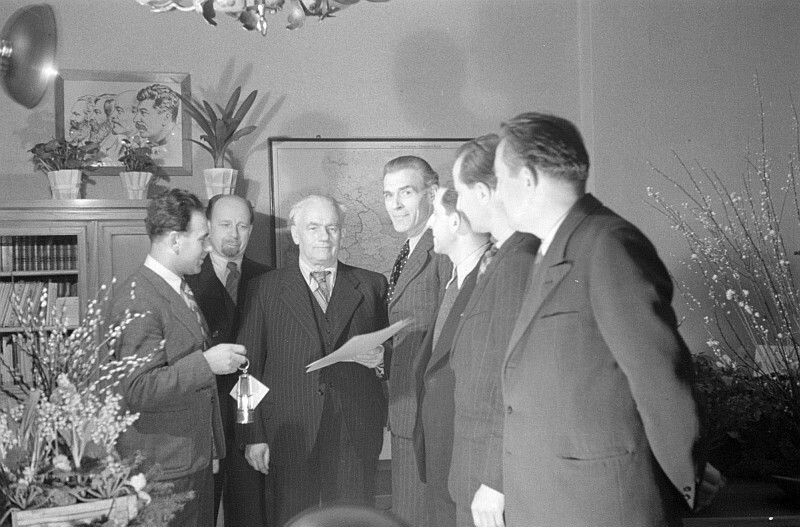
Merker (far left) with several other East German dignitaries, 1946

In 1946 Paul Marker returned to Germany, where he became a member of the Party Committee, the Central secretariat and the Politburo of the Socialist Unity Party of Germany (SED), a new political party formed in the part of Germany occupied by the Soviet Union, by forcibly merging the old KPD and Social Democratic Party of Germany (SPD) parties. He also promptly became a member of the Brandenburg regional legislative assembly.

In March 1948 he became a member of the (at this stage still provisional) People's Chamber (national legislature) / Volkskammer of the German Democratic Republic, retaining his seat there till August 1950. Between 1949 and 1950 Merker was the new country's Secretary of State for Agriculture. Between 1946 and 1949, jointly with Helmut Lehmann, he headed up the (East) "German Labour and Social Welfare Administration" ("Deutsche Verwaltung für Arbeit und Sozialfürsorge", renamed in 1948 "Hauptverwaltung für Arbeit und Sozialfürsorge")

=== 1950 career crisis ===
==== A member of the nation's core leadership team ====
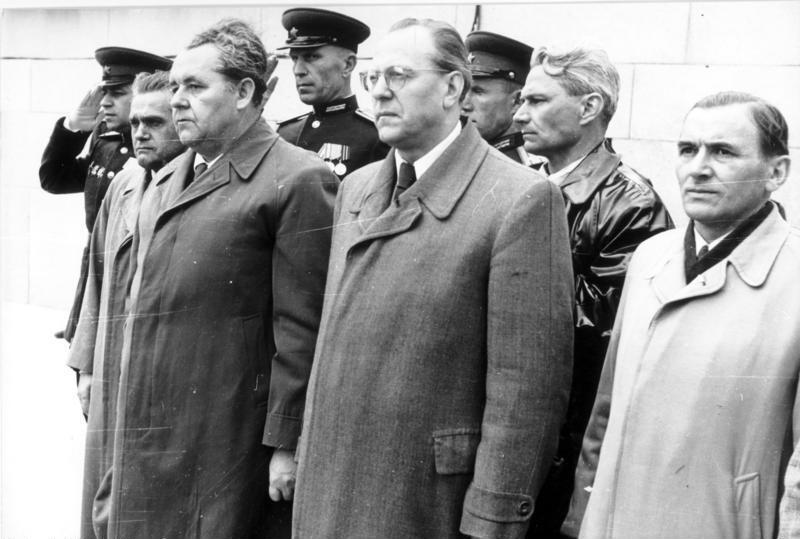
Otto Grotewohl (front, second from right) and Merker (front, third from right) at the inauguration of the Soviet memorial in Treptow, 1949

During the early years of the SED Paul Merker appears to have been at the heart of East Germany's ruling party. As the country's political parties were reconfigured in 1946 he was one of just seven KPD members chosen to join the fourteen member SED secretariat, and following a further reconfiguration of the party organisation in 1949 he moved on to join the Politburo, at the summit of the SED's power structure. In conversations held during the final year of his life with the historian Wolfgang Kießling Merker nevertheless insisted that he did not participate in the central policy decisions; from 1948 he had the sense that he had no future within the party leadership.

==== Rivalry and festering mistrust ====
Walter Ulbricht, the East German leader was one of a relatively tight-knit group of German communists who spent the war in Moscow, and then turned up in Germany at the end of April 1945 on a nation building mission, mandated by the Soviet leadership: Ulbricht would always remain close to Moscow. Current knowledge suggests that Stalin's mistrust of Paul Merker dated back at least to 1940, when Merker had shared with Comintern and KPD colleagues in Moscow criticism concerning the August 1939 Non-aggression pact between the Germans and the Soviets. It was an opinion he shared even more forcefully in the presence of Anton Ackermann, who later reported a 1939 meeting of the exiled KPD that had taken place in Paris directly following announcement of the Nazi-Soviet pact, which Merker had characterized as an "unimaginably crass and shambolic anti-Soviet failing", in a peroration that had lasted for several minutes and which was felt to have "shown the true face" of Paul Merker. According to the historian Norman Naimark, Merker was by 1950 seen by the Soviets as an advocate for a more radical approach by the ruling SED, and he was thought to be sympathetic with "sectarianist" former KPD members who had cooperated in the merger with the SPD only reluctantly, and many of whom still exercised significant influence at a regional and local level.

In addition to Soviet reservations concerning Merker, some sources contend that personal differences of temperament and of political approach between Merker and Walter Ulbricht himself formed the basis of a long running mutual antipathy that dated back to the late 1920s. By January 1933, when for a short period (before the German communists were forced to focus on emigration as a means of survival) Ulbricht was campaigning to succeed Ernst Thälmann as party leader, there was already talk of Merker as "crown prince" to Ulbricht. In 1953 it was reported that the rivalry between Merker and Ulbricht was the story of a 25-year rivalry between two contrasting demagogues, although, ominously, the report also suggested that Merker's re-arrest on 30 November 1952 heralded the knock-out punch.

==== Interrogation and a close escape ====
In summer 1950 the SED launched an investigation against various suspects, including Paul Merker. What happened next can be seen in the broader international context of the Rajk show trial that took place in Budapest in 1949 and of the related Noel Field affair. Merker was placed under house arrest and interrogated by the Central Party Control Commission (ZPKK). There were questions about a long conversation he had had with Noel Field in Mexico, back in the summer of 1945, at a time when the American Communist Party had been unable to confirm Field's "reliability". Merker's flight to Mexico was evidence that he was mistrustful of the Soviet Union. Along with Willi Kreikemeyer, Leo Bauer, Bruno Goldhammer, Adolf Ende and Maria Weiterer, on 22 August 1950 Paul Merker was excluded from the party. Even though the interrogators of the ZPKK had identified Merker as the most heavily implicated of this group, he was not - unlike Kreikemeyer, Bauer and Goldhammer - arrested once he had been excluded from the party, because President Pieck (who himself still retained the trust of Stalin) had intervened on his behalf.

Life in the political fast lane did not resume, however: Merker was sent to live in a small town called Luckenwalde, and here he was given an "HO" restaurant to run.

==== Re-arrest ====
In the course of the 1952 Slánský show trial in Prague, a new "Hive of conspiracy" was allegedly uncovered, and Paul Merker's name came up. On 30 November 1952 he was again arrested and removed to the Stasi detention centre at Hohenschönhausen. The party's central committee published a statement on 20 December 1952, stating that Merker was guilty of having participated, as its leader for East Germany, in the conspiracy recently uncovered in Prague. For the first time, in this context, mention was also made of Merker's "Zionist" attitudes. During his Mexican exile in the early 1940s and in subsequent articles in Neues Deutschland he had demanded that compensation be paid for Jewish assets expropriated by the Nazis. He had supported the creation of a Jewish state and pleaded for the recognition of Jews as a national minority within Germany. Most of these attitudes had been uncontentious for the party until 1948/49 and the reorientation of Soviet policy on the Middle-East.

Merker was held in custody for more than two years, pending a trial which finally took place on 29/30 March 1955 before the First Criminal Division of the Supreme Court, and concluded by sentencing the prisoner to eight years, for "Crimes against Article 6 of the constitution German Democratic Republic". The court determined that Merker had since 1941/42, or earlier, been an informer or an agent for French Intelligence, and that his subsequent actions had been directed against the continuance of the German Democratic Republic. After the end of the Second World War Merker had remained in contact with secret service "agents", recently condemned in Prague at the 1951 Slánský show trial, Otto Katz, Otto Fischl and Bedřich Geminder. Other matters which weighed heavily with the court included Merker's close political and personal relationship with Earl Browder, along with his position on the Jewish compensation issue, his attitude regarding Israel, and the close connections he had formed with "Zionist circles" during his time in Mexico.

=== Rehabilitation ===
==== Release ====
In January 1956, just over six months after receiving his eight-year sentence, Paul Merker was released from custody. After being bedridden for two months he had written a letter to President Pieck and to the ZPKK, rejecting the charges under which he had been convicted and demanding public rehabilitation. Walter Ulbricht, in his capacity as First Secretary of The Party's Central Committee, replied that the matter of release was one that should be managed by the party and/or the institutions-of-state responsible for rehabilitation. In July 1956, in a secret session, the same judge and the same court which had condemned Merker the previous year now pronounced him free. Although he had not served out the eight-year sentence handed down in the early summer of 1955, he had by now been held in custody for more than three years, and he emerged from prison seriously ill. He never fully recovered his health.

==== Another show trial - now as a witness ====
On 21 November 1956 Merker took part in a meeting which, he later told the historian Kießling, he had neither sought or planned ("unbewusst und ungewollt"). The meeting took place in a small town called Kleinmachnow which happened to be where Walter Janka, a friend from their shared political exile in Mexico during the Nazi years, lived. The meeting involved the circle of which Janka and the Marxist intellectual Wolfgang Harich, were members, and it was members of this circle who were arrested a week or two later. Faced with a Security Ministry interrogation on 9 January 1957 at which he was asked about the November 1956 meeting, Paul Merker confirmed that at Kleinmachnow Wolfgang Harich had called for the replacement of the country's leader, Walter Ulbricht: in July 1957 Paul Merker appeared as a prosecution witness against Walter Janka. (Defence witnesses were not permitted.) In pretrial discussions Merker was initially unwilling to accept a deal regarding his testimony on the extent of Janka's culpability, but the State prosecutor, Ernst Melsheimer successfully threatened him:

"Be under no illusions, that you really belong on the docket. You are separated by a hair's breadth from the traitor Janka. You belong beside him. And if you do not here speak truthfully, then you must expect to take your place beside him on the docket."

As Janka would write more than thirty years later, Merker began, with a choking voice, to testify against Janka, and later, supported by a courtroom official, was removed from the proceedings.

==== Return to relative normality ====
On 29 December 1956 The Party accepted Paul Merker back into the politburo, and in 1957 a house was placed at his disposal in Eichwalde, a small town on the southern edge of Berlin. That year he began work as an Editor for Foreign Literature with "Verlag Volk und Welt", a major publisher of German and international fiction.

On the occasion of his 70th birthday in 1964 Merker was awarded the Banner of Labor. In 1966 he sat, as "deserving party veteran" ("verdienter Parteiveteran") on the presidium committee organising the celebration of the party's twentieth birthday.

Paul Merker died in 1969, and his rehabilitation was clearly complete when the state reacted by posthumously awarding him the Patriotic Order of Merit (Gold / 1st class). His ashes were placed with those of others honoured by The Party, at the Socialists' Memorial in the Friedrichsfelde Central Cemetery at Lichtenberg (Berlin). A further mark of official approval came five years later, in 1974, when Paul Merker's face appeared on a ten Pfennig postage stamp.

His wife, Margarete, died in 1984.
