= Bernhard Steinberger =

German engineer, economist, and communist critic of the SED (1917–1990)

Bernhard Steinberger (17 September 1917 - 16 December 1990) was a communist German-Jewish engineer and economist. After 1945 he became an East German political dissident, spending most of the period between 1949 and 1960 in prison for his critique of what he saw as the SED's flawed approach to socialism. He had, by this time, already spent the war years accommodated in a succession of "emigrants' camps" in Switzerland, where he had arrived from Milan with his mother and sister in 1938 in order to escape the effects of newly introduced antisemitic legislation in Italy.

== Biography ==
=== Provenance and family ===
Bernhard Steinberger was born in Munich where Dr. Max Steinberger, his father, worked as a prosecutor at the district courthouse. However, Bernhard's father died a couple of weeks after Bernhard was born. After the war his mother remarried which led to the birth of a sister five years younger than himself, but his mother's second marriage ended in divorce during the 1930s. After leaving school in 1934 he spent six months as a volunteer in an automobile repair shop before embarking on an engineering apprenticeship with Ertelwerk, a manufacturer of Precision mechanical products, in their factory in the western part of central Munich. He demonstrated a rare enthusiasm and talent for constructing model airplanes and dreamt of becoming an aviation technician or an aircraft designer. However, the National Socialist government which had taken power in 1933 were now enshrining in legislation the shrill racist rhetoric for which they had become noteworthy in opposition. The Steinbergers are described in sources as a family of secular or assimilated Jews: Bernhard's Jewish provenance made it unlikely that he would be offered a fulfilling job in the aviation industry, especially given the sector's important role in the government's re-armament plans. In July 1936, still aged only 18, Bernhard Steinberger emigrated to Milan, to be followed soon afterwards by his mother and sister.

=== Italy and exile ===
In November he found an illegal badly paid job as a draftsman. Next came a design job with a firm making house building machinery. In October 1937 he finally obtained a design job with a manufacturer of road-construction machinery and tractors: the work was sufficiently well paid to enable him to support his mother and sister. However, antisemitic legislation to be set in place towards the end of 1938 put an end to hopes of a secure future in Italy, and Berhard Steinberger emigrated to Switzerland where visa requirements had not yet been introduced. He arrived in Zürich on 2 September 1938, followed a couple of weeks later by his mother and sister. They received financial support from Jewish refugee support charities ("Jüdische Flüchtlingshilfe"). There was no question of embarking on a normal life in Switzerland, however. They were classified as "tolerated migrants" ("tolerierten Emigranten") which meant that they were not permitted to look for nor to take paid work.

=== Switzerland ===
Steinberger made good use of his enforced unemployment. During 1938/39 he attended lectures and took part in experiments for two terms at the Photographic Institute at the ETH (Federal Institute of Technology) in central Zürich. During 1939/40 he participated in a Metal Work course. He became a frequent visitor to the library at the Swiss Social Archives, also in the city centre. It was here that he met his first wife, a librarian. She was a member of the (recently banned) Communist Party of Switzerland. The marriage broke apart after a year and a half, but Steinberger's interest in politics continued to deepen. At the library he also became a committed reader of the weekly journal "Aufbau der schweizerischen Religiösen Sozialisten". Leonhard Ragaz, a leading theologian who headed up the organisation producing the journal, was an energetic man and a committed pacifist who also campaigned very publicly in support of the interests of recently arrived migrants. War broke out in September 1939. All the countries surrounding Switzerland participated directly in it apart from Liechtenstein. Switzerland was powerfully impacted. In March 1940 the Swiss parliament decided to revoke the blanket ban on paid employment being undertaken by "tolerated migrants" (refugees), but at the same time plans were set in train for the construction of labour camps to be administered by the police. In July 1940 Bernhard Steinberger was sent to the labour camp at Tamins, just outside Chur in Graubünden/Grisons. This turned out to be the first of six different labour camps in which he would successively be accommodated during the war. During that period he was able to obtain a work permit for work which he undertook as a designer for a total of twenty months. In the camps he came into close contact with German communists, and involved himself in some of their activities. That included trying to find ways to improve conditions in the camps and the establishment of the (very successful) "Emigrants' Cultural Community" ("Kulturgemeinschaft der Emigranten in Zürich e.V."). It also involved setting up (secretive) party cells and, as the war progressed, Free Germany groups in the camps. As the war approached its end Bernhard Steinberger was accepted into the German Communist Party at a conference held at Zürich in February 1945. In recognition of his participation in party work his membership was backdated to 1940.

=== Postwar Germany ===
In September 1945 Steinberger was repatriated to Munich, which by this time was part of the US occupation zone. The Bavaria Communist Party ("KP Bayern") very soon sent him to take charge of "Economic Office B" ("Wirtschaftsamt B") in the Wasserburg district, in the countryside between Munich and Salzburg. Later, in May 1946, he was appointed Bavaria Communist Party district secretary for Wasserburg. He also took charge of the "Economy and Communities" department in the regional leadership of the Bavaria Communist Party. The next year the regional leadership sent him across to the Social Sciences faculty ("Gesellschaftswissenschaftliche Fakultät" / "GwewiFak") at the University of Leipzig in order to undertake a Study course in Economics. The intention was that on completion of his studies he should become the Economics expert on the national executive of the national Communist Party. It was, even at the time, a little unusual for a leading party officer in the US occupation zone to cross the frontier into the Soviet occupation zone in order to study economics, but for the Communist Party leadership the political context at Leipzig was presumably an attraction. (It would take several more years before the frontier on the ground dividing East Germany from West Germany would become impermeable.)

In 1946 Berhard Steinberger married his second wife, Ibolya. The two of them had met in Switzerland, where Ibolya, secretly a Communist Party member, had found work as a house-maid/nanny. When the war had ended Ibolya's mother was still living in Felsőnána, in the countryside to the south of Budapest. In May 1947 Bernhard and Ibolya relocated from Munich to Leipzig with their infant son. At Leipzig Steinberger studied with Prof. Fritz Behrens, later remembered as one of the principal architects of East Germany's "New Economic System". Behrens rated Steinberger's abilities highly and was strongly supportive. It was probably during 1947 that Berhard Steinberger joined the recently constructed Socialist Unity Party ("Sozialistische Einheitspartei Deutschlands" / SED). Steinberger would later look back on his time at Leipzig as the best time in his life, despite the food shortages and lack of heating. (Note: "Meine Zeit in Leipzig ... war zweifellos die schönste meines Lebens, so schwer auch hier die materielle Lage (Ernährung und Heizung) war.") He prepared quickly for the appropriate state exams and made progress on a dissertation.

=== Arrest and detention of Iboyla Steinberger ===
In October 1949 the region administered as the Soviet occupation zone was relaunched as the Soviet sponsored German Democratic Republic (East Germany). By that time things had gone terribly wrong for the Steinbergers. Ibolya Steinberger was arrested first. She was detained in Budapest on 28 May 1949 as a suspected spy. She was making her way home from a three-month stay with her mother in Felsőnána, which she had undertaken so that her infant son might meet his grandmother (and vice versa). In her passport she had carelessly placed a folded up copy of an article by Georg Markos which her husband had sent her to look after for the institute where he worked. It concerned "The Impact on state-owned industries of the Hungarian three-year plan". It later became clear that the article had already been published and widely distributed in academic circles: it contained no secrets. The men who arrested her at Budapest had nevertheless decided that she was working as a courier on behalf of her husband, who in his turn was working for "the Americans". A link was made to the activities of the American spy Noel Field who had been arrested in Czechoslovakia, amid much state mandated publicity, two weeks earlier. Ibolya Steinberger's travel patterns, taking in Hungary, Germany's Soviet occupation zone and Switzerland, fitted with the espionage hypothesis. In what she later described as "a state of diminished accountability" Iboyla Steinberger was persuaded to sign a false confession. Two weeks later she retracted that confession to an officer of the Soviet security services, but the retraction had no obvious effect.

By the end of October 1949 the Hungarian authorities had found three false witnesses to testify against her. (One of these, István Stolte, would retract his evidence in 1954.) Ibolya Steinberger was placed under enormous pressure, and after being asked in a threatening manner whether she actually wanted ever to see her husband and child again, she was persuaded to sign another false confession, this time fully conscious of the importance of ensuring that she was incriminating no one except herself. In April 1950 she was interned, it was explained, "for a short time". In fact she was held at Kistarcsa for a little under four years, including one year during which she was held in solitary confinement. It was only on 21 August 1953 that she had the chance to read the three or four line indictment which had led to her detention. The charge was one of espionage on behalf of the Americans. About a week later she was given an eight-year sentence, against which four and a half years already spent in investigatory custody and internment would be off-set. Ibolya Steinberger spent another year in the women's prison at Kistarcsa. At a secret hearing in July/August 1954 she was informed that she was not guilty and would soon be released. In preparation for that, she would be transferred to Budapest by the end of August. Actually it was only at the end of October 1954 that she was sent to the "transfer prison" in Budapest. She was held for a further six months without any sort of court hearing. Conditions were markedly worse than before. She was not permitted to write anything and her cell was unheated. While her hands and feet were frozen, she had open skin sores that went untreated, as did the stomach complaint that she had picked up. Then, on 4 May 1955, "because of an amnesty", she was returned to her mother and her (now eight and a half year old) son in Felsönána. By this time Ibolya Steinberger weighed just 35 kg (roughly 78 pounds). During the rest of 1955 she received a succession of official assurances that work was underway on a change to her conviction. But when she was finally able to depart for Berlin on 2/3 March 1956, there was still no sign of that. Only on 4 October 1956 did the Hungarian High Court issue decision "B.Eln. Tan. 001353/1956/2", declaring the defendant "free and rehabilitated" from the charges against her "due to the absence of any criminal offence" ("wegen Fehlens eines Straftatbestandes"). A written copy of that decision was handed over by the Hungarian embassy in East Berlin, but only in 1960.

=== Arrest and detention of Berhard Steinberger ===
Bernhard Steinberger was detained a couple of weeks after his wife. On 9 June 1949 he was arrested in Leipzig by members of the Soviet security services, and that same night taken by train to Berlin and the large Hohenschönhausen detention centre in Berlin. Hohenschönhausen later became infamous as a Stasi facility, but in 1949 it was still under the control of the Soviet authorities. Forty years later, in 1989, Bernhard Steinberger recalled his experiences at Hohenschönhausen: "After I was admitted ... I was interrogated without a break. I should confess my crimes: my wife had already confessed. I was physically mistreated, sometimes with beatings and kickings, but only rarely, and always within the breaking-point threshold. Much more serious was the sleep deprivation and being forced to listen to the cries of people being beaten in the nearby cells".

Slowly Steinberger came to understand that his arrest had not been a mistake by junior officials, but the result of a series of cold political calculations that would cost dozens of people their lives in the People's democracies of central Europe. His indictment ran to almost half a page, supporting the core accusation of "espionage and sabotage performed on behalf of an imperialist power, directed against the Soviet Union, the People's democracies and the Soviet occupation zone [of Germany]". The bizarre charges were constructed around Steinberger's interactions with the Hungarian Communist Party group during his and their time in Zürich. The other pillar on which the accusations rested also came from his time in Zürich and concerned his contacts with the Unitarian Service Committee (USC) headed up by Noel Field. It was true that the USC had agreed to fund Steinberger's engineering studies when he was in Switzerland, but the offer had subsequently been withdrawn after the Swiss authorities objected to it. The USC in Switzerland had provided three more modest cash grants to Steinberger in order to finance (1) a trip to Bern in 1943, (2) attendance on a postwar course for academics and (3) to fund his return to Germany in 1945. Whatever the USC's true status, the Soviet authorities had become convinced that it was an American front organisation for unwelcome espionage activities. Steinberger did what he could to prove his innocence, working through his curriculum viate with his accusers and giving details of all the contacts he had had in Switzerland. He took great care to avoid coming up with anything that could be construed as a confession. But events unfolded according to their own momentum, regardless of anything he could do or say. In November 1950, after not quite eighteen months in detention, he was informed that the "distance tribunal" ("Ferntribunal") in Moscow had decided on a fifteen-year sentence. It was, like many such decisions at the time, the result of an administrative process. No trial had taken place. No witnesses or proof had been presented for examination. There had been no defense counsel involvement.

While Ibolya Steinberger waited to learn her fate in a reassigned wartime detention camp at Kistarcsa, on 25 December 1950 Berhard Steinberger began the long rail journey from Berlin across the Soviet Union. His transport reached the Vorkuta labour camp complex on 1 February 1951. He was allocated to Camp 9 and, for daytime work, Shaft No. 8. Initially his difficulties were exacerbated by his inability to speak or understand Russian. Physical conditions in the camp were particularly harsh: over time they appear to have improved later. For Steinberger there was a constant current of anti-semitism which he learned to ignore, but it never completely went away. He was fit, and as he began to master the language and become acclimatized to the conditions, he began to find the hard physical work manageable, except during the final six months of his time in the camp when his customary fitness became compromised following of an accident. Mentally and physically, he remained in one piece.

Steinberger later said that life in the labour camp gave him a realistic picture of the inner condition of Soviet society under Stalin. Stalin's death in March 1953 was followed by what some sources call the Khrushchev Thaw and, among camp inmates, a cautious revival of hope. On 1 April 1954 Steinberger submitted to the Soviet Party Central Committee an application for a review of his trial. Later he learned that his application had been suppressed by labour camp administrators, however. In May 1955 he addressed a personal letter of complaint to First Secretary Khrushchev, and another to the Party Central Control Commission. An officer from the military prosecutors' office was mandated to look at the case, but at the end of September 1955, before he could do so the officer's assignment was cancelled as an indirect consequence of the so-called "Adenauer-Initiative". Identified as an "amnestied war criminal", Bernhard Steinberger was released and arrived back in Berlin on 10 October 1955.

=== Home to the German Democratic Republic ===
Steinberger lost little time in applying to the party central committee for rehabilitation, which he did on 31 October 1955. At this stage he received only a qualified endorsement, however, in the form of a so-called "professional cover" ("berufliche Absicherung"). However, he did receive backing from Gerhard Harig, the relevant secretary of state, for his plan to work for an "Aspirantur" academic qualification. With effect from 1 April 1956 he was enrolled as an Aspirant at the Institute for Economic Sciences at the German Academy of Sciences in (East) Berlin. His supervisor was the same Prof. Fritz Behrens who had taught him back in 1947 when he had first crossed over from the west, and who was now deputy director of the institute. Steinberger's work focused on the theme of "Planning and Labour productivity", which covered a politically explosive and economically crucial set of challenges with which, some felt, the German Democratic Republic never entirely came to terms. Steinberger plunged into his research work with relish, investigating a succession of case studies at state-owned enterprises, and discovering a succession of abuses in the process, both in respect of the manufacturing production cycles and involving export agreements. The Steinbergers continued to come up against ominous official reluctance as they pursued their claim for full and unqualified political rehabilitation. It was only on 14 July 1956 that a resolution of the National Party Control Commission confirmed their party membership since 1945. By now feeling thoroughly insulted, on 7 October 1956 they lodged a protest with the Control Commission. A few months later Benhard and Iboyla Steinberger would both find themselves excluded from the party.

=== Re-arrest ===
On 29 November 1956, slightly more than a year after he got back from the Soviet labour camps, Bernhard Steinberger was identified by the security services as a member of what the East German media later took to demonizing as the Harich Group, and arrested. He was taken back to the Hohenschönhausen detention centre in Berlin, which since his previous experiences of the place had become a Stasi facility. It later turned out that the party politburo had approved his arrest on 27 November. The Stasi had by this time been monitoring Wolfgang Harich's dangerous dilettante activism for some time, and certainly since he had presented his ideas to the Soviet ambassador Georgy Pushkin in October 1956. Steinberger was caught up in the same surveillance programme. Surviving Stasi records include two reports on Steinberger submitted to the department's West Germany intelligence directorate (HVA) on 28 November by an informant identified as "GI Walter". (Note: "Geheim Informator" or "GI" denotes a "Secret Informant".) "GI Walter" may have been one of Steinberger's fellow "aspirants" at the Academy of Sciences. The reports are dated 31 October and 16 November, and they indicate that the "Harich Group" (which in this context effectively meant Wolfgang Harich and his friend Manfred Hertwig) had picked out Steinberger as the man to elaborate a new economic programme in a post-Ulbricht East German government. Evidence held by the authorities also included a telephone intercept of a call that Steinberger had made to his wife from Harich's apartment on 22 November 1956, asking her to take part in a meeting.

In fact Steinberger had met Wolfgang Harich only twice before his arrest. It was Manfred Hertwig, as editor of the "Deutsche Zeitschrift für Philosophie", who had mentioned Bernhard Steinberger to Harich and then invited Steinberger to that meeting in Harich's apartment on 22 November. As the afternoon and evening wore on Harich had expounded to the two of them his ideas for a programme of political reform, also speaking of ways in which such a programme might be made available to the public in the event that his preferred approach, which involved presenting his programme to the party central committee, was followed by rejection. In reply to Harich's request, Steinberger said that he was ready to work through the draft of the policy programme which Harich wanted to complete over the next few days, "casting a critical eye over it and, especially, so far as might be necessary, to rework the economics part". Harich and Steinberger agreed on the need for absolute secrecy in relation to third parties, especially since Harich suspected (correctly) that his telephone was being tapped. This conspiratorial aspect of their relationship would weigh strongly against Steinberger at his subsequent trial.

=== Interrogation and trial ===
On 25 November Harich visited Steinberger at the latter's apartment and handed over the draft of his Reform Programme for critical review. At the time of his arrest four days later Steinberger had still not made a start on reviewing the programme and it is far from clear that he had even read it, since his time had been taken up with a work-related trip to Leipzig. Influenced by his friend Richard Wolf he had become increasingly uncertain over whether he should be having anything at all to do with Wolfgang Harich's "adventurism" (as Wolf termed it). None of this was taken into consideration at Steinberger's trial, however. On 9 March 1957 he was sentenced at the East German High Court under Article 6 of the Constitution to a four-year prison term, having been found guilty of "Boykotthetze" (loosely, "calling for a boycott"), a charge frequently used by the East German courts against dissidents during this period. The pre-trial investigations and hearings ran from 29 November 1956 till 14 February 1957. That included forty-one minuted interrogation sessions, starting on the night of his arrest with an interrogation that ran from 20.30 in the evening to 4.00 the following morning. As part of the process Steinberger (like Hertwig) was required to provide a detailed résumé of his life to that point (dated 1 January 1957). He was also required to provide separately a "Rechenschaftslegung über meine geistige Entwicklung bis heute", giving details of his spiritual and religious development (dated 9 January 1957). This document covers 43 pages of typescript. The psychological pressure under which he was kept throughout this experience led him to provide the required statement of "repentance" - by this time an integral part of the Stalinist "show terror trial" ritual since the time of Bukharin. But the statement of "repentance" that emerged in the case of Bernhard Steinberger was neither effusive nor unqualified:

- "I am clear that arrest has prevented me undertaking political actions against the German Democratic Republic. It has been established - even if I had broken from Harich, and it is not certain that I had - I would not have abandoned my oppositional attitude".

It will be observed that the simple removal of the word "not" in two places would completely reverse the meaning of the second of the two sentences included here. And a nuanced political ambivalence remained apparent in Steinberger's later life. His commitment to socialism never wavered, but his critical attitude towards what the relevant governments termed "Real socialism" (which critical comrades came to view as increasingly indistinguishable from "Soviet-style socialism") became increasingly pronounced, at least until he came to appreciate that a ruling party unable or unwilling to differentiate between a reformer and a revisionist was unlikely to be interested in the ideas put forward by either.

=== Against the preferred intellectual currents ===
In the course of his (carefully minuted) interrogation dated 8 December 1956, and again in the document he compiled for his interrogators a month later detailing his "spiritual and religious development", Steinberger sets out his underlying ideas for the reform of the planned economy. His criticism of the bureaucratic and administrative focus of the East German planning system, as well as his advocacy for the concept of self-administering businesses, together with the central position in his thinking of the Law of value, reflect a set of economic guidelines and priorities that in most respects follow ideas of his old mentor and tutor Prof. Fritz Behrens. It was probably not a total coincidence that during 1957 Fritz Behrens found himself accused by the authorities of "economic theoretical revisionism" and stripped of all his academic posts.

Steinberger was attacked in the mainstream East German press. An article appearing in Neues Deutschland on 1 December 1957 later formed a basis for a legally framed defamation accusation which he addressed to the prosecutor's office in 1963.

=== Productive detention at a price ===
He was sentenced to a four-year term of imprisonment on 4 March 1957. On the same occasion precisely the same sentence was given to Wolfgang Harich and Manfred Hertwig. On 4 April 1957 Steinberger was transferred to the penal labour camp at the Stasi Hohenschönhausen detention complex. His surveillance order contained the chilling form of words entered by the prosecutor: "Strafe muß verbüßt werden" ("Sentence must be served"). That had the effect of ruling out, from the start, the granting of parole after two years which in "non-political" cases would normally have been applied. Ibolya Steinberger was left to bring up their son as a single parent. While working at the Elektro-Apparate-Werke ("Electrical Appliances Plant") in Berlin-Treptow she suffered a physical collapsed. Later, despite opposition from the party's National Control Commission, she was able to find work that was less physically demanding in the medical support sector. Steinberger fared better than his experiences in the Soviet labour camp earlier n the decade might have led him to anticipate. He was still in Berlin. Fairly soon he received agreement that he could undertake academic work. He worked on lecture notes and studied more generally on political economics for the Institute for Economic Sciences at the German Academy of Sciences where he had been working at the time of his arrest. He was also producing work for the "Sciences department" of the party central committee. It was presumably at least in part because of the extent to which his academic career had been interrupted by "events" that Bernhard Steinberger had never completed a doctoral thesis. Now, while still in prison, he was able to take up research work in preparation for a doctoral dissertation. His written permission came in a hand-written one-word comment, "Einverstanden" ("Agreed") dated 4 July 1957, from the man in charge at the Ministry of State Security (Stasi), Erich Mielke, himself. His allocated supervisor, Dr. Herbert Neumann from the Economics Department carefully guided him towards a firmly theoretical topic that would require no contact with real-world East German state enterprises. He pursued his studies on the presumably innocuous topic of "Wachstumsgesetze der sozialistischen erweiterten Reproduktion". (The work appears to have remained unpublished and the doctorate, at this point, not completed, though presumably elements of it found their way into Steinberger's academic work during the 1960s and 70s.)

Of course privileges signed off by the head of the Stasi came with a price tag. Between December 1957 and October 1960 Bernhard Steinberger was a "Kammeragent". That means he acted as a covert "contact person" on behalf of the authorities. He compiled 24 reports for "management" in which he recorded details of discussions, disagreements and sources of discontent among the detainees. In this way he was able to contribute to the development of "fairer working conditions" for inmates. But the Stasi (who were still in charge of his detention at Hohenschönhausen) wanted more. Division HA I/7/II (a section of the National People's Army involved in Counterintelligence) recruited Steinberger for a piece of special work: he was invited to help "enlighten" and "expose" a People's Army officer who had already been convicted as a spy. On 3 January 1958 Steinberger signed up for the assignment, choosing the code name "Fritz Schwarz". However, a few days later, on 14 January, he informed the relevant commanding officer that he was not prepared to betray his socialist convictions and play the role of a "tuppenny-ha'penny youth" (eines "Achtgroschenjungen"). Despite this, he was still re-registered as a "Geheim Informator" (GI / "Secret Informant") on 1 April 1958. However, records show that the counterintelligence division decided to "break off the connection" on 23 July 1958, since "GI Fritz Schwarz" had not fulfilled the demands made of him.

=== Release: with strings attached ===
Bernhard Steinberger was released on 26 November 1960, two days ahead of the scheduled end of his sentence thanks to a "Gnadenerweis" (loosely, "mercy certificate") issued by the State Council (Staatsrat). For this particular "pardon" he was required to sign the usual pre-printed "Statement of obligation" ("Verpflichtung"): "I will show myself worthy of the 'Gnadenerweis' from the State Council of the German Democratic Republic through honest work, and I commit myself to comply with the laws of the German Democratic Republic". (Note: "Ich werde mich des Gnadenerweises des Staatsrates der Deutschen Demokratischen Republik durch ehrliche Arbeit würdig erweisen und verpflichte mich, die Gesetze der Deutschen Demokratischen Republik einzuhalten".) More eye-catching for some commentators was another "Statement of obligation" which he had signed a month earlier, on 24 October 1960: "To me it is no more than a self-evident part of my East German citizenship that I should work with the Ministry for State Security (Stasi), and this obligation is only increased because I have acted against the state, which as long as I live I will regret. I will steadfastly act in accordance with this obligation everywhere and ignoring anyone [attempting to block my determination to do this], and this I irrevocably swear. I choose the cover name "Fritz". (Note: "Es erscheint mir als staatsbürgerliche Selbstverständlichkeit, mit dem Ministerium für Staatssicherheit zusammenzuarbeiten, und dies um so mehr, als ich mich gegen den Staat vergangen habe und dies, solange ich leben werde, bereuen werde. Die mit dieser Tätigkeit verbundene Pflicht, über alles und gegen Jedermann zuschweigen, werde ich unverbrüchlich wahren. Ich wähle den Decknamen Fritz.") In terms of the principal undertaking provided this statement differs little from the standard declaration of obligation signed by hundreds of thousands of Stasi informants over the years, though readers who detect a hint of irony (which presumably his interlocutors at the time failed to spot) may find themselves tempted to the suspicion that on this occasion the informant involved helped with the drafting of the text for his own declaration.

=== An unsatisfactory informant ===
Steinberger's signed commitments came after four lengthy conversation in which Lieutenant Enderlein of HA V/2/II (military counterintelligence) informed the newly re-recruited "GI" (secret informant) of a concern on the part of the authorities that, following Steinberger's release, he was more than likely to be contacted by representatives of the Hamburg-based opposition group "Der dritte Weg" ("The Third Way"), who would want to recruit him or persuade him to emigrate to the west without permission (which would be illegal). When he was contacted he was to report details to his handlers. (To be quite sure, arrangements were made through the Stasi for Steinberger's telephone to be tapped during January and February 1961.) One individual whom Enderlein said was likely to contact him was his former "Harich Group" contact, Manfred Hertwig. In fact, the anticipated approaches never materialised. He received a postcard from Hertwig on which he was able to report, but it amounted to no more than an innocuous greeting, without any reported follow-up. In 1965 Steinberger was able to report a couple of political conversations he had conducted with a Hamburg journalist, which involved further greetings from Hertwig. For the rest, in terms of the kind of detail likely to interest his Stasi handlers, the records indicate that DSteinberger's reports were disappointingly bland. In meetings with handlers he repeated his insistence that he would never betray his personal or political convictions and there was no question of attempting to sum up the characters of people he had known over time. He explained that for him to attempt to do that would risk misrepresenting their current [political] opinions, because people can change their minds. He pointed out that he himself was driven by far too many ideological ambiguities to be able to report with clarity on the opinions of other people.

Where - in exceptional cases - Steinberger can bring himself to mention in his reports people whom he comes across at work (or elsewhere) then he never writes anything negative. There is no ammunition for any denunciation or systemartic "Zersetzungs programme". In 1960 he provided a glowing report on the works director at VEB Motorenwerk Zschopau, a major motor-cycle producer. Steinberger knew the man well. The party already received plenty of reports on him because of his senior position at the factory. Steinberger's report testifies to his outstanding character, his professional accomplishment and his political soundness. In 1961 his report to his handler consisted of a robust defense of a leading official at the Economics College in Berlin-Karlshorst who had suffered unjustified attacks from colleagues with influence in the party hierarchy. Otherwise, records indicate that Steinberger increasingly used his meetings with his handler to discuss his personal problems, and would then move on to discuss with outrageous candour the political and ideological questions which were bothering him. Naturally deep political-philosophical discussions were not included on the script of his Stasi handler who was unable to provide any very convincing answers. Because of all this, Steinberger's consciencously provided routine reports and assessments, along with the reports on him provided by other informants, led handlers to conclude that he was an irrascible and incurable "revisionist" and deviant who, because of his own experiences of harsh treatment by state agencies, could probably be expected to avoid going too far with his oppositional attitude.

In the absence of satisfactory results, it seems likey that it was in 1963 that HA V/2/II (military counterintelligence) reassigned "GI-Fritz" to "Abteilung (section) XX/6" of "City Administration Greater Berlin" (at that ime still within the ambit of the Stasi), as a "Sicherungs GI" (Security Secret Informant) at the Berlin Economics College ("Hochschule für Ökonomie ..."). From the point of view of the authorities this was not a satisfactory solution, since Steinberger refused to follow instructions in terms of reporting on the behaviours of individuals. On 3 April 1964 his hader reported that "In respect of many issues the GI shares the opinion of Havemann [a prominent government critic]. His ideologies gets closer and closer to those of class enemy. There are a lot of things he does not acknowledge ... With this GI you have to conduct constant ideological disputes". After 1967 his handlers reported that they kept only in "loose contact" with this informant, sufficient only to ascertain Steinbergrer's own opinions about political developments. So the files show the Stasi in 1968 recording Steinberger's "negative attitude" over the Warsaw Pact invasion of Czechoslovakia. On 17 February 1969 "Abteilung (section) XX/6" gave up on their troublesome GI and their files on and from "GI Fritz" were archived.

=== Struggling for a return to "normality" ===
After his release from detention at the end of 1960 Steinberger worked, for approximately six months, at VEB Elektro-Mechanik in Berlin as a "Technisch begründete Arbeitsnorm (TAN) Berarbeiter", responsible for ensuring product conformity to prescribed standards. He quickly became a TAN group leader, remaining in post till agreement had been reached over his longer term professional future.

Following consultation with the Secretary of State at the Ministry for Higher Education it was agreed that the pre-doctoral work that Steinberger had undertaken while in detenention on the "Wachstumsgesetze der sozialistischen erweiterten Reproduktion" provided sufficient evidence of Steinberger's suitability for an academic post. He was advised to apply to the Economics College ("Hochschule für Ökonomie ") in Berlin-Karlshorst. With the agreement of both the Secretary of State and of the party central committee, on 16 June 1961 he accepted an appointment as a research assistant at the college's Institute for Popular Economic Planning ("Institut für Volkswirtschaftsplanung"). However, the path to a conventional academic career remained blocked by a clause in the court judgment he had received on 9 March 1957, which had stipulated that Steinberger "should not be active in the public service nor in any leading function in economics or the arts". (Note: "...»weder imöffentlichen Dienst noch in leitenden Stellungen im wirtschaftlichen und kulturellen Leben tätig sein...") Accordingly, on 2 September 1961 Steinberger applied to the East German Prosecutors' office for "remission of the punitive measures". based on undertakings he had received in connection with the "Gnadenerweis" (loosely, "mercy certificate") on which his release from custody at the end of 1960 had been based. In addition to the lifting of the restrictions on his right to progress his academic career, he also sought restoration of his right to vote and stand for election.

=== In pursuit of restorative justice ===
Two years later, on 20 January 1963, Steinberger turned to the Prodecutor's Office with an application for the punishment to be struck out. In a detailed submission in support he starts with the way on which he was already defamed in the party mass-circulation newspaper, Neues Deutschland, on 1 December 1957. He had already been punished for actions against peace, which was clearly unjustified. Only on 16 May 1963 did he receive a confirmation from the chief prosecutor that the conviction had indeed been struck out from the Punishments Register on 9 May 1963, subject to the consent of Central Department IX of the Ministry for State Security (Stasi), which was inferred from a characteristic one word note ("Einverstanden" ("Agreed")) added personally by the Stasi boss, Erich Mielke.

On the day he applied to the Prosecutor's Office to have his punishment struck out Steinberger also lodged a claim for restitution with the State Council (Staatsrat). The claim concerned six and a third years of detention while not guilty, and the loss of property in connection with the Rajk affair which had erupted in 1949 in the People's Republic of Hungary. Back in March 1958 his wife had already, through her lawyer, received notification from the Leipzig city authorities that furniture which the family had acquired by means of a loan agreement had been withdrawn at some point following the couple's arrest in 1949. She had been informed through the same intermediary that there existed "no record" concerning the whereabouts of their other assets, such as household goods, books, clothes and personal papers. Everything they had possessed at the time of their arrest was "unfindable", as though there never had been a Steinberger family living in Leipzig. Steinberger pursued the matter with the authorities again in 1963 despite being advised by his Stasi handler, with whom at this point he was still in regular contact as an informant ("Geheim Informant"), that he had forfeited any claim he might have had for compensation over his detention as an innocent man through his "hostile actions against the German Democratic Republic" (wegen seine "feindlichen Handlungen gegen die DDR").

=== Return to teaching ===
On 18 April 1963 Bernhard Steinberger finally received a communication from the secretary of state that the authorities were "in agreement with his commitment to teaching" ("Einsatz in der Lehrtätigkeit einverstanden"). The threat to his future academic career from the stipulation in his sentence back on 9 March 1957 that he "should not be active in the public service nor in any leading function in economics or the arts" appeared to have been lifted. On 24 April 1963, after discussions with future colleagues at the college Steinberger reluctantly but definitively withdrew his claims for restitution: "I will not disguise the fact that my decision to draw a line under the events of 1949-1955 is a difficult one. But my desire to live in harmony with the party to which I feel I belong was decisive. (Note: "Ich will nicht verhehlen, daß mir der Entschluß, den Schlußstrich unter die Geschehnisse 1949-1955 auf diese Weise zu ziehen, schwer gefallen ist. Das Verlangen, mit der Partei, der ich mich zugehörig fühle, in Übereinstimmung zustehen, gab jedoch den Ausschlag.") Future developments would make a mockery of his reasoning here. Steinberger's strong reservations about the party leadership of Comrades Ulbricht and Honecker continued to underpin his political attitudes. The party advised him later during the 1960s that his expulsion from it had become irrevocable.

There were more disappointments and indignities, but during the later 1960s he was nevertheless able to make progress with his academic career. In 1963 Steinberger lodged his (first) application for restoration of his recognition as a victim of National Socialist persecution. He had to wait till December 1967 before that status was re-conferred. In February 1964 he was required to break off work on a research project he was undertaking for the National Planning Commission. Then, after lodging a complaint with the State Council (Staatsrat), he was permitted a two year research contract with the Economics Research Institute of the National Planning Commission. The subject of his researches was work-force planning in the context of overall long-term economic planning ("Volkswirtschaftliche Bilanzierung und langfristige Planung der Arbeitskräfte"). He was able to incorporate this work into a dissertation entitled "Grundlagen der prognostischen und perspektivischen zentralen Arbeitskräfte- und Bildungsplanung" in return for which he finally received a doctorate, two days after his fiftieth birthday, on 19 September 1967. The assessors awarded his work a "summa cum laude" commendation.

On 1 June 1970 Steinberger accepted a professorship in Socialist Economics, over the next seven years, till his retirement in 1977, his focus was entirely on teaching. He planned to research and obtain his habilitation, a higher academic qualification generally seen as a way to reinforce a professional career in the universities sector. However, his plans for a suitable dissertation, submitted in 1974, were not accepted. During the surging wave of social and political changes that were a feature of 1989/90 Bernhard Steinberger became a Berlin-based advisor to New Forum.

=== A final appeal for justice ===
Developments during the 1980s did much to vindicate Bernhard Steinberger's long-standing diagnoses of the East German economic model. In those countries were the Soviet sponsored states of Eastern Europe had traditionally been able to trade East Germany had during the 1960s and 1970s enjoyed a near monopoly in heavy engineering and other "technical" manufacturing sectors, but during the 1980s, as heavy industry in the Soviet Union began to modernise, East German salesmen in shared export markets began to encounter Soviet comrades not as partners but as commercial rivals. Increasingly dependent on variously disguised West German subsidies, the country was running out of cash and credit. After 1985 Winds of change blowing across from, of all places, the Moscow Kremlin left East Germany's increasingly geriatric political leaders feeling isolated and uncertain about the future (although their commitement to "traditional" socialism appeared solid). When street protesters breached the Berlin Wall in November 1989 it quickly became clear that Soviet troops standing by had received no orders to intervene on behalf of the status quo. There would be no repeat of 1953. Events assumed their own momentum. That was the context in which, on 15 January 1990, Bernhard Steinberger saw an opportunity to renew his campaign for justice with an application to the High Court in East Berlin for the "revision of the judgments against Harich, Steinberger and Hertwig". He summarized again his reform ideas from 1956, which had simply revolved around the increasingly mainstream goals for a de-Stalnized socialist party and the establishment of a democratic East German state.

On 28 March 1990 the High Court quashed the sentence from 9 March 1957. By this time Steinberger was seriously ill, however, and was unable to attend the court. Bernhard Steinberger died in Berlin on 16 December 1990, slightly more than three months after reunification.
