= Heinz Zöger =

- Born: 19 November 1915; Leipzig, Germany
- Died: 21 March 2000 (aged 84); Berlin, Germany
- Occupations: Journalist; Broadcaster
- Spouse: Carola Stern (1926-2006)

Heinz Zöger (19 November 1915 in Leipzig – 21 March 2000 in Berlin) was a German political journalist. Between 1968 and his death in 2000, he was married to Carola Stern.

== Biography ==
Heinz Zöger was born in Leipzig: his adoptive father was a lithographer. On leaving school Zöger, between 1930 and 1933, undertook an apprenticeship as a type setter. In 1932, he was a member of the "Antifaschistischen Roten Garde" and also around this time of Revolutionary Union Opposition (RGO / Revolutionäre Gewerkschafts Opposition). After 1933, he was twice arrested and sentenced to terms of imprisonment because of his resistance activities.

After the Second World War, almost all of which he had spent in prisons in Germany, he joined the German Communist Party (KPD / Kommunistische Partei Deutschlands) and held senior positions in what became the East German Broadcasting Corporation.

From 1955 till autumn 1956, he was Editor in Chief of the weekly Newspaper "Sonntag" ("Sunday"). On 8 March 1957, during the trial of the Harich Group, Zöger was arrested in the courtroom for taking part in the counter-revolutionary activities of the group. In July of the same year, he was sentenced to a prison term along with Walter Janka, then in charge of the Aufbau-Verlag, a major East German publishing house, Gustav Just and Richard Wolf for crimes against Article 6 of the East German Constitution. He was released in 1959 and fled to West Germany. In May 1990, the East German Supreme Court set aside the judgement of 1957 under which Zöger had been sentenced.

He later obtained a job as an editor with Cologne-based West German national broadcaster, Westdeutscher Rundfunk.
