= Ernst Melsheimer =

First State prosecutor of the German Democratic Republic

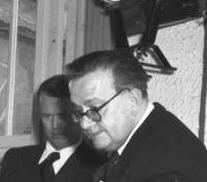
- Ernst Melsheimer (1952)
- Born: 9 April 1897; Neunkirchen, Germany
- Died: 25 March 1960 (aged 62); Berlin, East Germany
- Education: University of Bonn; University of Marburg
- Occupation: Chief state prosecutor

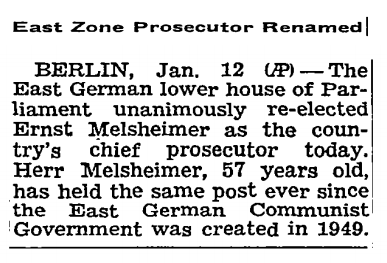
International publicity for the show trials which he conducted as state prosecutor gave Melsheimer a higher public profile in the west than East German legal officers might, under other circumstances, have expected. His reappointment as his country's Attorney general in January 1955 was even reported in The New York Times .

Ernst Melsheimer (9 April 1897 in Neunkirchen – 25 March 1960 in Berlin) was a German lawyer.

In December 1949 he was appointed as the first State prosecutor of the German Democratic Republic, which at that time was a new country being created out of the Soviet occupation zone of what had till recently been Germany. Melsheimer became (after Hilde Benjamin) the second most important state lawyer in the young country.

Melsheimer was a strong believer in party control of the courts. He was opposed to any Western-style separation of powers between the justice system and the state. He took a hands-on approach to his job, appearing in person as the principal (prosecution) advocate in numerous secret trials and in high-profile show trials during the 1950s.

== Biography ==
=== Early years ===
Melsheimer was born in the Saar region, a mining area in the extreme west of Germany, close to the border with France. His father was a director of the local iron works. His school career ended with the outbreak of World War I, and in 1914 he volunteered for military service. However, he was injured after only eight weeks, and left the army. He instead studied Law at and Marburg and Bonn, passing his state law exam in 1918.

While a student Melsheimer became, in 1915, a member of the Arminia Marburg fraternity, at that time one of the largest such fraternities in Germany.

=== Legal career ===
In 1918 he entered the service of the Prussian Justice Department, promoted in 1922 to the grade of Oberregierungsrat. In 1924 he was appointed a regional judge (Landgerichtsrat), with a succession of judicial promotions following. He was appointed to Landgerichtsdirektor in 1933, and in 1937 he joined the Higher District Court Council (Kammergerichtsrat) in Berlin.

Melsheimer became involved in the Nationalsozialistische Rechtswahrerbund (NSRB / National Socialist Association of Legal Professionals) in 1936, and in 1937 he was appointed a consultant to the Nationalsozialistische Volkswohlfahrt (NSV / National Socialist People's Welfare organisation). He was formally rewarded for his services in 1940 when he received the Loyalty Medal of The Leader - 2nd class (Treuemedaille des Führers 2. Klasse).

He was nominated as a Supreme Court Judge in 1944, but he was never able to take up the position because no vacancy had arisen by May 1945, when the court was dissolved as a consequence of the country's military defeat. He was therefore successful in building his career under the Nazi regime without the need fully to demonstrate "Total Loyalty to the National Socialist State" ("die Treue zum nationalsozialistischen Staat").

=== After The War ===
Immediately after the end of World War II, Ernst Melsheimer joined the Communist Party of Germany (KPD / Kommunistische Partei Deutschlands). Much of the country was now occupied by the Soviet Union. The Soviet leadership had views that did not embrace a multi-party political framework for those parts of Europe under Soviet military control. In what was rapidly becoming the separate state of East Germany the KPD in 1946 found itself obliged to merge with the moderate left Social Democratic Party of Germany (SPD / Sozialdemokratische Partei Deutschlands) which left Melsheimer as a member of East Germany's ruling SED (Socialist Unity Party of Germany/Sozialistische Einheitspartei Deutschlands). He also found himself one of just three senior lawyers who had been active under the Nazi regime still permitted to work as lawyers in the new German Democratic Republic.

Quotation

Even before his appointment as Chief State Prosecutor, at the Third Session of Legal Affairs Group of The Party's Central Committee in January 1948, Melsheimer set out his commitment to a strong state:

"It is an old revolutionary and democratic principal, as you should appreciate, that you can transform a state if you control two elements: the Police and the Justice System. The Police we have taken in hand, but not yet the Justice System. Our goal should be to take that in hand too."

Ernst Melsheimer (1948)

„Man sollte beherzigen, daß es ein alter revolutionärer und demokratischer Grundsatz ist, daß man einen Staat dann umwandelt, wenn man zwei Dinge in der Hand hat: die Polizei und die Justiz. Die Polizei hat man in der Hand, die Justiz noch nicht. Daß wir sie in die Hand bekommen, sollte unser Ziel sein."

Ernst Melsheimer (1948)

=== A political lawyer ===
==== Career progression ====
Melsheimer's first position under the new regime was as a prosecutor in Berlin, where he was noted, among other things, for requesting politically motivated death sentences. Between 1946 and 1949 he also served as Vice-President of the (East) German Central Justice Administration (DJV / Deutsche Zentralverwaltung der Justiz). (The DJV was installed by the Soviet Military Administration SMAD) and turned out to be the forerunner of the East Germany Justice Ministry.)

Melsheimer got himself noticed within The Party, notably on 14 August 1948 when his was the decisive signature for a personnel-purge at the top of the DJV. His boss at the DJV was Eugen Schiffer, an octogenarian Liberal Democrat lawyer who had been a Member of the Reichstag during the Weimar years. In August 1948 DJV President Eugen Schiffer took a vacation. He returned to find high-level personnel changes at the DJV that favoured the SED (party). Schiffer rightly felt snubbed, and immediately submitted his resignation. As his deputy Melsheimer thought he would succeed to the top job, but in this he was to be disappointed. Under Order no.158, on 2 October 1948, the Soviet Military Administration appointed not Melsheimer but Max Fechner to head up the DJV.

On 7 December 1949 Ernst Melsheimer was appointed to the position for which he is best remembered, as the first Attorney general, and thereby Chief Prosecutor, in the Number 1 Criminal Division of the East German Supreme Court. In this position he (successfully) called for the death penalty at several show trials including those of Johann Burianek and Wolfgang Kaiser. Victims of other high-profile show trials prosecuted by Melsheimer included Wolfgang Harich, Walter Janka, Leo Herwegen, Otto Fleischer und Leonhard Moog. Melsheimer served as prosecutor in numerous secret trials.

Quotation

Ernst Melsheimer on the Supreme Court:

"The supreme court should speak on critical questions in support of the fundamental underpinnings of our state and for the survival of our Republic. It should provide its judgement from a high platform clearly visible to the entire nation. It should pronounce quickly and correctly. ... Trial by the highest court, with the widest possible publicity, strengthens and deepens the democratic vigilance of the masses."

Ernst Melsheimer

„Das höchste Gericht soll in den für die Grundlagen unseres Staates und für den Bestand unserer Republik entscheidenden Fragen Recht sprechen; es soll auf hoher, weithin dem ganzen Volke sichtbarer Plattform urteilen; es soll schnell und richtig urteilen. [...] Die Aburteilung [...] durch den höchsten Gerichtshof in breitester Öffentlichkeit stärkt und vertieft die demokratische Gesinnung und die demokratische Wachsamkeit der Massen."

Ernst Melsheimer

==== Courtroom tactics ====
Melsheimer became notorious for court room tactics that included savage verbal assaults which at that time would have been unacceptable in western courts, against defendants and witnesses, and which regularly overstepped the bounds of constitutional justice. A defendant who survived and many years later published an account of his experiences was Walter Janka. Another show trial victim, Janka's friend, the former Minister of Agriculture Paul Merker, had recently been released from jail and was called into court to testify against Janka. In pretrial discussions Merker was initially unwilling to accept a deal regarding his testimony on Janka's involvement in the conspiracy alleged, but Melsheimer successfully threatened him:

"Be under no illusions, that you really belong in the dock. You are separated by a hair's breadth from the traitor Janka. You belong beside him. And if you do not here speak truthfully, then you must expect to take your place beside him in the dock."

At the start of the same trial Melsheimer was just as successful in using similar threats to dissuade Janka's wife from testifying in support of her husband. He pointed out that in the trial of the editor Wolfgang Harich, which had taken place in March 1957, three months earlier, the journalist Heinz Zöger and the radio commentator Richard Wolf who had turned up to testify on behalf of the defendant had been arrested in the courtroom, charged with membership of the same conspiracy as the defendant, detained, and a few months later convicted and sentenced themselves.

=== Finally ===
Melsheimer retained his position as Chief State Prosecutor until March 1960, when he died. His ashes were placed with those of others honoured by The Party, at the Socialists' Memorial in the Friedrichsfelde Central Cemetery at Lichtenberg (Berlin).

His successor was Josef Streit.

== Recognition ==
Twice Melsheimer was awarded the Patriotic Order of Merit (Class 2 - Silver) for "his services to building socialism in the GDR".

== Reading list ==
- Ernst Melsheimer, Internationales Biographisches Archiv 16/1960 vom 11. April 1960, im Munzinger-Archiv (Artikelanfang frei abrufbar)
- Helmut Müller-Enbergs: Melsheimer, Ernst. In: Wer war wer in der DDR? 5. Ausgabe. Band 2, Ch. Links, Berlin 2010, ISBN 978-3-86153-561-4.
- Jürgen Weber, Michael Piazolo (Hrsg.): Justiz im Zwielicht – Ihre Rolle in Diktaturen und die Antwort des Rechtsstaates. München 1998, ISBN 3-7892-9201-X, S. 176–189.
- Britta Heymann: Ernst Melsheimer (1897–1960). Eine juristische Karriere in verschiedenen staatlichen Systemen. Peter Lang, Frankfurt am Main 2007, ISBN 978-3-631-56214-7.
- Bärbel Holtz (Bearb./Hrsg.): Die Protokolle des Preußischen Staatsministeriums 1925–1938/38. Band 12/II. (1925–1938). (= Acta Borussica. Neue Folge). Olms-Weidmann, Hildesheim 2004, ISBN 3-487-12704-0.
- Helge Dvorak: Biographisches Lexikon der Deutschen Burschenschaft. Band I, Teilband 4, Heidelberg 2000, Literature by and about Ernst Melsheimer in the German National Library catalogue, S. 76–77.
