= Harich =

Harich may refer to the following places:

- Harich, Netherlands, a village in Friesland, the Netherlands
- Harich, Armenia, a village in Shirak, Armenia
- Harich Group
- Wolfgang Harich (1923-1995), German journalist and philosopher
