= Kistarcsa internment camp =

Hungarian internment and transit camp used under successive regimes

Coordinates: 47.5477°N 19.2604°E

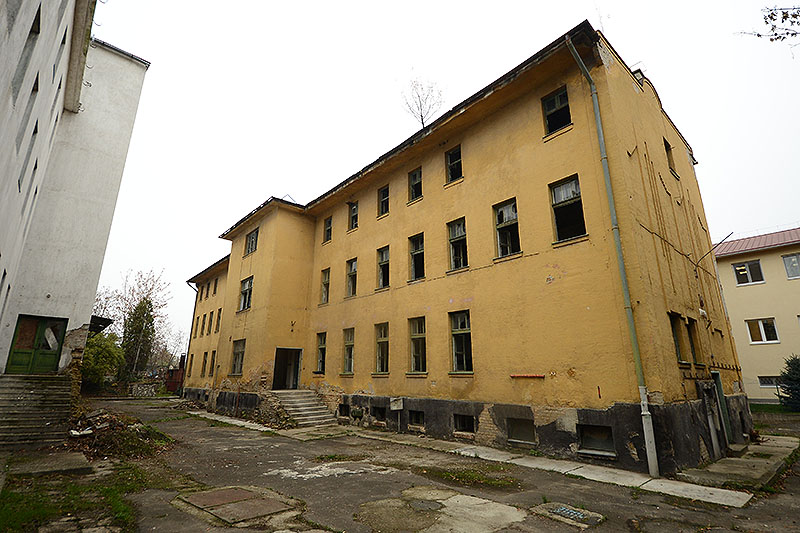
A surviving building of the former Kistarcsa internment camp

The Kistarcsa internment camp (Hungarian: Kistarcsai internálótábor), also referred to in Holocaust literature as the Kistarcsa concentration camp, was an internment, detention and transit camp at Kistarcsa, northeast of Budapest, Hungary. Established by the Hungarian authorities in the early 1930s on a former workers' housing estate, it was used under successive Hungarian governments to detain political prisoners, refugees and others without ordinary criminal proceedings.

Following the German occupation of Hungary in March 1944, Kistarcsa became one of the principal detention and transit sites used in the persecution of Hungarian Jews. Several of its barracks came under German control, while other sections remained under the Hungarian police administration. Jews arrested by German and Hungarian authorities were confined there before deportation, and approximately 1,800 prisoners were sent from Kistarcsa to Auschwitz-Birkenau on 28 April 1944, in one of the first transports of Hungarian Jews to Auschwitz that year.

In July 1944, camp commander István Vasdényey helped alert Jewish leaders to another planned deportation. A train carrying about 1,500 prisoners was ordered back to Kistarcsa after Regent Miklós Horthy intervened, but Adolf Eichmann subsequently sent an SS detachment under Franz Novak into the camp on 19 July and deported most of the group. Vasdényey's efforts to protect Jewish prisoners were later recognised by Yad Vashem, which named him Righteous Among the Nations in 1969.

After the Second World War the site was again used for administrative internment. From 1949 it became the central internment camp of the communist authorities, and on 5 May 1950 it was taken over directly by the State Protection Authority (ÁVH). Political detainees and others considered undesirable by the communist government were held there without ordinary judicial proceedings, and Kistarcsa also functioned as a collection and transit centre for prisoners subsequently sent to forced-labour camps such as Recsk, Tiszalök and Kazincbarcika.

The internment system was dismantled in 1953 under the government of Imre Nagy. Kistarcsa was nevertheless reopened following the suppression of the Hungarian Revolution of 1956, officially beginning operations again on 25 February 1957 as a centre for persons placed in "public security custody". The camp was finally closed later that year when its administration was merged with the new internment centre at Tököl on 1 December 1957.

== Origins ==
The buildings from which the camp developed were originally constructed as a residential colony for employees of the Gép- és Vasútfelszerelési Gyár (Machinery and Railway Equipment Factory). The factory, established at Kistarcsa in 1908, employed approximately 1,000 people and created a workers' settlement containing housing and community facilities on what had previously been undeveloped land beside the railway.

The factory failed during the Great Depression. The Ministry of the Interior subsequently acquired the former workers' colony for use by the police. The site came under Interior Ministry control in 1932 and was developed into an auxiliary internment centre intended partly to relieve overcrowding in the Budapest police detention system.

Prisoners were being transferred to Kistarcsa during the early 1930s. The camp was substantially expanded following the promulgation of internment regulation 760/1939.

Administrative internment allowed the authorities to confine people without a conventional criminal conviction. According to contemporary regulations, internment could be imposed on those considered dangerous to public order, public security or other State interests. In practice, detainees included homeless people, prostitutes, people accused of ordinary public-order offences and members of political movements at both ends of the political spectrum.

Communists detained there included Antal Apró and László Rajk. Rajk was arrested by the Hungarian police in October 1941 and was held at Kistarcsa for much of the following three years.

Foreign refugees and people whose citizenship status was disputed were also confined under Hungarian administrative-internment regulations. Among them were Jewish refugees from other European countries.

== German occupation and the Holocaust ==
=== Expansion of the camp ===
Germany occupied Hungary on 19 March 1944. Arrests of Jews, political opponents and others began immediately, with both German security organisations and Hungarian authorities participating.

Kistarcsa, which had originally been intended to accommodate only around 200–250 prisoners, was rapidly expanded and became severely overcrowded. During the German occupation it held approximately 1,500–2,000 prisoners at a time.

The complex consisted of five principal barracks. Their populations and administration differed. Some sections came under direct German control, while others continued to be supervised by the Hungarian camp authorities.

The so-called 'C barracks' became particularly overcrowded with Jews arrested by Hungarian authorities for alleged violations of anti-Jewish decrees. People could be detained for matters such as travelling in prohibited circumstances, using a telephone, failing to display the yellow star in the prescribed manner or attempting to conceal property.

The 'D barracks' held prisoners arrested directly by the Gestapo and the Eichmann Sonderkommando. Both Jews and non-Jews were included among these detainees. Prisoners in the German-controlled sections were subjected to particularly restrictive conditions and physical abuse.

Another group consisted of approximately 280 Jewish lawyers arrested as hostages shortly after the German occupation. They were housed in the B barracks. Unlike prisoners directly controlled by the Gestapo, they remained largely under the authority of the Hungarian camp command.

The United States Holocaust Memorial Museum includes Kistarcsa as a separate site in its Encyclopedia of Camps and Ghettos, 1933–1945. The museum has also described Kistarcsa as a "Hungarian-run" internment camp outside Budapest.

=== István Vasdényey ===
Police official István Vasdényey served as commander of Kistarcsa from June 1942 until November 1944.

Although he could not control the German-administered sections of the camp, Vasdényey attempted to improve conditions and secure releases for prisoners under his authority. Working with lawyer and former Budapest police chief Károly Dietz and Jewish relief organisations, he used legal and administrative arguments to obtain the release of some elderly people, women and children.

Vasdényey also permitted Jewish organisations to provide prisoners with food, medicine and other assistance. Szekér estimates that these efforts affected hundreds of detainees.

His actions were subsequently recognised by survivors. In 1969, Yad Vashem awarded Vasdényey the title Righteous Among the Nations.

=== April 1944 deportation ===
During the night of 27–28 April 1944, prisoners in the C barracks were driven into the camp courtyard and prepared for deportation. Approximately 1,800 people were loaded into freight wagons and transported to Auschwitz-Birkenau.

The Auschwitz-Birkenau State Museum identifies the transports from Kistarcsa on 28 April and Topolya on 29 April as the first transports of Hungarian Jews sent to Auschwitz during the 1944 deportation operation. The main phase of the deportation of Hungarian Jewry began in May.

After the April deportation, Kistarcsa's population fell to approximately 350–400 but soon increased again as new detainees arrived. By June it again held between approximately 1,000 and 1,500 people.

The German guard presence was reduced after the April transport, and the Hungarian camp administration regained direct responsibility for most of the compound. The Budapest Jewish Council and Vasdényey subsequently attempted to have threatened Jews transferred to Kistarcsa because they considered detention there safer than remaining exposed to other German security organisations.

=== July deportations ===
Regent Miklós Horthy ordered the cessation of the large-scale deportation of Hungarian Jews in July 1944. Eichmann nevertheless sought to deport prisoners still held at Kistarcsa.

On 12 July, Vasdényey learned that the Germans had ordered a train of 50 wagons to be made available at Kistarcsa on 14 July. He secretly informed the Jewish Council through Sándor Bródy, a representative of the Jewish relief organisation operating in Budapest.

Approximately 1,500 prisoners were loaded onto the train on 14 July. Jewish leaders succeeded in informing Horthy, who ordered the transport stopped. The order reached the train at Hatvan, and it returned to Kistarcsa with its passengers that night.

The incident was later considered during the 1961 Eichmann trial. The Jerusalem court found that Eichmann had attempted to continue the deportation despite Horthy's prohibition and that the intervention of Jewish leaders had led to the train's return.

Eichmann then arranged another operation without allowing the Jewish Council an opportunity to intervene. On the morning of 19 July 1944, members of the Jewish Council were kept at Eichmann's headquarters while an SS detachment commanded by Franz Novak entered Kistarcsa.

The SS unit disarmed or neutralised the Hungarian camp personnel, cut communications and forced prisoners onto lorries. Vasdényey persuaded the Germans not to take approximately 300 Jewish hostages housed in the B barracks, but nearly 1,200 other prisoners were taken to Rákoscsaba, placed in freight cars and deported from Hungary.

The deportees were transported to Auschwitz-Birkenau. A letter written by prisoner Jenő Reich and thrown from the deportation train on 19 July was later introduced as evidence at Eichmann's trial.

=== End of wartime use ===
After Eichmann's unit temporarily withdrew from Hungary in August 1944, the danger of another sudden deportation from Kistarcsa diminished. Jewish lawyers held as hostages were released on 26–27 September.

Following the Arrow Cross Party seizure of power in October, an order was issued to evacuate the entire camp to a detention centre at Komárom. On 7 November, Vasdényey accompanied a train carrying the remaining prisoners. According to archival evidence examined by Szekér, he had the train stopped near Vác and released the prisoners. The Arrow Cross authorities subsequently issued a warrant for his arrest.

== Post-war use, 1945–1949 ==
Kistarcsa was reopened as an internment camp in the spring of 1945. Administrative internment remained available to the new Hungarian authorities and was used against people deemed politically or socially dangerous without necessarily bringing them before an ordinary court.

This phase lasted until the end of October 1946.

In the summer of 1947 a police training unit named after László Rajk was established at Kistarcsa. It remained there until the spring of 1949.

During 1949, as the Hungarian Working People's Party consolidated communist control, the authorities again prepared Kistarcsa for mass internment. Renovation began in March, and from 30 April 1949 prisoners and staff of the Buda-South Central Internment Camp were transferred to Kistarcsa.

The site consequently became the principal central internment facility of the emerging communist security system.

== ÁVH central internment camp ==
=== Takeover by the State Protection Authority ===
On 5 May 1950, armed personnel of the State Protection Authority (Államvédelmi Hatóság, or ÁVH) entered the Kistarcsa camp, disarmed its police guards and took direct control.

Kistarcsa became one of the ÁVH's principal central collection camps. People placed under administrative internment were brought there after the issuance of an internment order, and prisoners could subsequently be distributed to other camps controlled by the State security apparatus.

These included the secret forced-labour camp at Recsk, opened in July 1950, followed by camps at Tiszalök and Kazincbarcika.

Detainees included former politicians and officials, military and police officers, clergy, intellectuals, people characterised by the regime as members of hostile social classes and people suspected of political disloyalty. Foreign citizens were also interned. Archival research has documented, for example, Greek refugees imprisoned at Kistarcsa after being accused of espionage or political unreliability.

=== Conditions ===
Conditions deteriorated sharply following the ÁVH takeover. Windows were whitewashed and prisoners were forbidden to open them even during hot weather. Accommodation became severely overcrowded.

According to research published by the Committee of National Remembrance, prisoners were generally required to remain in their rooms except when collecting meals. They were normally permitted one hour's exercise in the courtyard each afternoon and were required to walk with their hands behind their backs and heads lowered.

Religious services which had previously been permitted were abolished and food provision deteriorated.

The camp included a separate women's section. A section for imprisoned clergy contained approximately 60 people. For a period, Catholic priests and members of religious orders operated an unofficial theological seminary within the compound, where 17 prospective priests continued their studies.

Prison labour was also used inside the compound. Facilities included a carpentry workshop and, for a period, a workshop in which prisoners manufactured wooden toys and other goods.

=== Closure in 1953 ===
After Imre Nagy became prime minister in 1953, the government began dismantling the system of administrative internment and forced-labour camps.

During the liquidation of the system, the authorities reviewed the cases of 5,075 internees nationally. Some were released, while others were transferred into the ordinary criminal-justice system and prosecuted.

Kistarcsa remained involved in processing cases during this transition. Foreign prisoners whose cases had not yet been resolved were transferred there from other camps, and some remained until October 1953. A group of Greek prisoners documented by the Hungarian National Archives was finally released on 31 October.

The camp ceased functioning as an ÁVH central internment camp in 1953.

== Reopening after the Hungarian Revolution ==
Following the Soviet suppression of the Hungarian Revolution in November 1956, the government of János Kádár again introduced administrative detention.

The measure was formally described as public security custody (közbiztonsági őrizet) rather than internment. It allowed the police to detain individuals considered dangerous to the State without first obtaining a criminal conviction.

A January 1957 instruction designated Kistarcsa as the national centre to which people ordered into public security custody were to be transported.

The camp officially reopened on 25 February 1957. By March it held 3,433 prisoners. The number subsequently increased sharply, reaching approximately 8,000 in April, creating severe overcrowding.

The authorities therefore established another camp in military barracks at Tököl. Prisoners were progressively transferred there, reducing Kistarcsa's population to about 1,400 by June and 991 by November.

The Kistarcsa and Tököl commands were formally merged with effect from 1 December 1957. The resulting organisation was headquartered at Tököl, bringing the history of Kistarcsa as an operating internment camp to an end.

Administrative detention under the post-revolution system continued elsewhere until 1960.

After the camp closed, parts of the complex were converted for use as a police training school and remained associated with Interior Ministry institutions for several decades.

== Notable detainees ==
People imprisoned or detained at Kistarcsa during its different periods included:

- Antal Apró, communist activist and later senior government official, interned during the Horthy period.
- Péter Boross, Prime Minister of Hungary from December 1993 to July 1994.
- György Faludy, poet and writer, held at Kistarcsa in 1950 before being transferred to the Recsk forced-labour camp.
- István Farkas, Hungarian painter, publisher and victim of the Holocaust.
- Jane Haining, Scottish missionary for the Church of Scotland in Budapest, Hungary, who was recognised in 1997 by Yad Vashem in Israel as Righteous Among the Nations for having risked her life to help Jews during the Holocaust.
- Gyula Lóránt, Hungarian footballer and manager of Croatian descent.
- Zoltán Meszlényi, Roman Catholic auxiliary bishop of Esztergom, imprisoned without trial and held in isolation at Kistarcsa, where he died in custody. The precise date of his death has been disputed.
- László Rajk, communist politician, interned for much of 1941–1944.
- Bernhard Steinberger, communist German-Jewish engineer and economist.

== Site and memorial ==
Parts of the former camp complex have survived, including buildings and sections of the surrounding brick wall.

A section of the former camp wall beside Október 23 Square has been developed as a memorial wall. Plaques commemorate prisoners and victims from different phases of the camp's history, and a memorial opposite the wall commemorates those who suffered there.

In 2012 the Kistarcsa municipal council adopted a resolution supporting the creation of a memorial site at the former camp.

On 30 September 2021, a new plaque was unveiled on the surviving camp wall in memory of Jews deported from Kistarcsa and murdered during the Holocaust. It was initiated by Holocaust survivor Azriel (Péter) Dansky. Representatives at the ceremony included leaders of the Hungarian Jewish community and the ambassadors of Israel, Germany and Switzerland.

In 2024 the Committee of National Remembrance published a digital three-dimensional reconstruction of the communist-era central internment camp. The reconstruction allows users to examine the parade ground, prisoner sections, women's accommodation and workshops.

== See also ==
- The Holocaust in Hungary
- German occupation of Hungary
- State Protection Authority
- Recsk forced labor camp
- Adolf Eichmann
- Hungarian Revolution of 1956
- Righteous Among the Nations
