= Lucie Pflug =

Lucie Pflug (24 February 1916 - 9 November 1993) was a senior cultural official in the German Democratic Republic (East Germany).

Between 1956 and 1978 she was the head of the "Publications, Book trade and Academic Libraries department" ("Sektor Verlage, Buchhandel und wissenschaftliche Bibliotheken"), working in the Knowledge Section of the powerful Party Central Committee. There was always a reluctance on the part of the authorities to acknowledge the existence of state censorship. It is nevertheless believed that Lucie Pflug's job gave her significant influence over what was published, and therefore over what was available to be read, in the German Democratic Republic.

== Life ==
Lucie Pflug was born in Kunersdorf, a small village in Brandenburg, east of Berlin. Her father was a blacksmith. She attended school locally and then, between 1930 and 1932, trained for work as a typist. Between 1932 and 1934 she was unemployed. In 1934 she took a secretarial job with the Berlin publishers, Delius, Klasing & Co., with whom she remained till 1943 working on the motor magazine Allgemeinen Automobil-Zeitung. Between 1943 and 1945 she is recorded as a "housewife", latterly in Kössern.

She showed an interest in socialist politics early on, joining the Youngs Communists in 1932. At the beginning of 1933 régime change heralded twelve years of one party dictatorship. Political parties (other than the Nazi party) were banned Lucie Pflug continued to undertake illegal political work in Berlin. War ended in May 1945: now in the Soviet occupation zone she joined (or possibly rejoined) the Communist Party of Germany. After April 1946 she was one of thousands who lost no time in signing their party membership across to the newly formed Socialist Unity Party ("Sozialistische Einheitspartei Deutschlands" / SED).

In 1946 she joined the Berlin publisher Aufbau-Verlag, initially as a secretary on the editorial staff and later as an editor. In 1949, the year in which the Soviet occupation zone was relaunched as a separate German state, the German Democratic Republic, she became head of the office at the weekly newspaper, Sonntag (Wochenzeitung). At the same time she joined the works council executive at the publisher. Between 1952 and 1954 she was the (SED) party secretary at Aufbau-Verlag. This was a politically important position under a political structure which insisted that "Where there is a comrade, the party is there too" ("Wo ein Genosse ist, da ist die Partei").

In 1952 Pflug was a member of the first cohort of students on the further education course for the publishing industry held by the "Walter Ulbricht" legal academy ("Deutsche Akademie für Staats- und Rechtswissenschaft" / ASR) at Potsdam. In 1954/55 she attended a training at the party's "Karl Marx" academy. In 1956 she was appointed to head up the "Publications, Book trade and Academic Libraries department" ("Sektor Verlage, Buchhandel und wissenschaftliche Bibliotheken"), under the direction of the Party Central Committee. Here she played an important role in defining a direction for literature and the publishing/book industries in conformity with the party line. Neues Deutschland, the party's mass circulation newspaper, paid tribute to her on the occasion of her sixtieth birthday:

- "In a twenty year career as section leader for the Central Committee of the SED, she rendered lasting service to the successful development of publishing and the book trade in the German Democratic Republic."
- "In ihrer zwanzigjährigen Tätigkeit als Sektorenleiter des ZK der SED erwarb sie sich bleibende Verdienste um die erfolgreiche Entwicklung des Verlagswesens und des Buchhandels in der DDR"

She remained in post for another two years, till 1978.

After her retirement in 1978, she remained a member of the board of the Publishers' Association for a further ten years, till 1988.

Lucie Pflug died in Berlin on 9 November 1993.
