= Zoltán Meszlényi =

Hungarian Catholic bishop

Blessed Meszlényi Zoltán
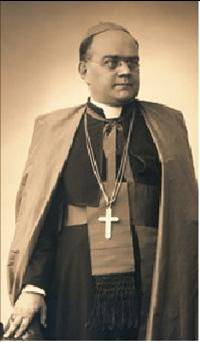
- Bishop Zoltán Lajos Meszlényi

Martyr
- Born: 2 January 1892; Hatvan, Austria-Hungary (now: Hungary)
- Died: 4 March 1951 (aged 59); Kistarcsa, Hungary
- Venerated in: Roman Catholic Church
- Beatified: 31 October 2009, Esztergom Basilica Hungary by Cardinal Angelo Amato
- Major shrine: Sanctuary of Blessed Zoltán Lajos Meszlényi in Budapest in Hungary (in construction)
- Feast: 4 March
- Attributes: book, palm, mitre
- Patronage: Catholic Action, bishops, prisoners

Zoltán Lajos Meszlényi was a Hungarian Catholic bishop, born in Hatvan on 2 January 1892. He died in prison on 4 March 1951 at Kistarcsa, Hungary. His death is recognised as martyrdom by the Catholic Church. He was beatified on 31 October 2009.

== Life ==
Zoltán Lajos Meszlényi the second child of five was born on 2 January 1892 in Hatvan near Budapest. His parents were Zoltán Meszlényi and Etel Burszky. The father at first was a teacher in a Catholic school, later he became school principal in Budapest. Here Zoltán went in Esztergom to gimnazy and to seminary.

=== Study in Rome ===
He arrived in Rome in 1909. Here became a student of the Pontifical German-Hungarian Institute. The seminarians completed their theological studies in the Gregorian Pontifical University (Gregoriana). He spoke Latin, Italian, German, English and French well, and while he was in Rome he further perfected his Ancient Greek and Latin and knew a little Spanish and Slovak. Finally, he achieved a doctorate in philosophy 1912. At the same time, in 1913, he also gained a diploma in theology at the Gregorian University. He finished his Canon Law studies at the Pontifical Gregorian University and obtained a degree.

=== Priest and bishop ===
After his ordination in Innsbruck 28 October 1915 Cardinal János Csernoch (1912–1927), The Primate of Hungary, named Zoltán Meszlényi pastoral assistant in Komárom. Not long after he transferred him to Esztergom to fundamental services.

Zoltán Meszlényi had chronic heart and thyroid problems. However, he was cured during the period between 21 May and 28 June 1937. In that time the Apostolic Nuntiature in Hungary communicated to Cardinal Serédi that the nomination of Zoltán Meszlényi as titular bishop of Sinope and coadjutor of Esztergom had been officially confirmed by Cardinal Domenico Tardini in Rome. The Episcopal ordination took place in the Basilica of Esztergom on 28 October 1937 – his priestly ordination's 22nd anniversary. The ordination was presided by Cardinal Jusztinián Serédi. The new bishop's motto was "fidenter ac fideliter" (With confidence and fidelity).

Zoltán Meszlényi, chapter vicar, took over his office in very difficult circumstances. In the end, barely 12 days after the election, on 29 June 1950, bishop Zoltán Meszlényi was detained.

For a short time was held in the Budapest detention center and then they transferred him to the intern camp at Kistarcsa. Here he was separated from the other prisoners in a room with no windows where freezing temperatures in the winter and scorching temperatures in the summer made the prisoner's life unbearable. The official accusation against his person with all probability was "antidemocratic behavior". From this moment on nobody saw him again.

== Death ==
Public and official hearing never took place. It is miraculous that some information managed to get out from the detention camp. From these bits of information we can construe what type of treatment this Servant of God was subject to, and what could have possibly caused his death. On 4 March 1951 he died.

== Beatification ==
10 March 2004 began the process of beatification. 31 October 2009 was his beatification in Esztergom. His holiday is 4 March.

== See also ==
- Szilárd Bogdánffy
- Áron Márton
- József Mindszenty
- István Sándor
- János Scheffler
- Lojze Grozde
- Jerzy Popiełuszko
- Miroslav Bulešić
- Francesco Bonifacio
- List of saints
- The Black Book of Communism

== Literature ==
- A főkegyúri jog és a forradalom, Esztergom, Esztergom 1920, Buzárovits Nyomda.
- Házassági köteléki perek az egyházi bíráskodásban, Esztergom 1927, Buzárovits Nyomda
- A kánonjogi tanulmányok fontossága, Budapest 1930, Szent István Akadémia.
- Alázatos szolgálat: Dr. Meszlényi Zoltán Lajos szentbeszédei, Budapest 2007, Don Bosco Kiadó. ISBN 9789639455689
