= Gustav Just =

German journalist and politician (1921–2011)

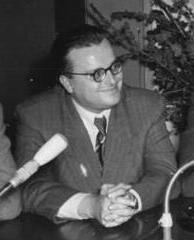
- 1954 meeting of German and Soviet writers and scientists
- Born: 16 June 1921; Reinowitz, Bohemia, Czechoslovakia
- Died: 23 February 2011 (aged 89); Brandenburg, Germany
- Occupation: Journalist

Gustav Just (16 June 1921 – 23 February 2011) was the first Secretary of the German Writers' Association (DSV) (German: Deutscher Schriftstellerverband) and editor-in-chief of the East German weekly Sonntag until 1957.

== Early life and military service ==
Just was born in Northern Bohemia. His father was a member of the Communist Party of Czechoslovakia.

After graduating from high school in 1940, Just volunteered to join the Wehrmacht. During World War II, he participated in the invasion of the Soviet Union. He was wounded twice in combat, and reached the rank of lieutenant. On 15 July 1941, Just, then 20, participated in the firing squad of six Jews rounded up from a village near Kholm, an incident which he recorded in his diary. According to the entry, Just had been told that the men, whom Ukrainian villagers described as "Jewish terrorists", were criminals who'd attacked a Ukrainian family and killed her husband. In his entry, he wrote: "It's a strange feeling to shoot a person for the first time. And if it's a criminal." He was promoted after the killings.

Over the course of the war, he received the Iron Cross First Class, Infantry Assault Badge, Eastern Medal, and the Black Wound Badge.

== Post-war life ==
After the war, Just joined the Socialist Unity Party of Germany. On a questionnaire, he omitted almost all information regarding his time in the war. In 1957 he was arrested for opposition activities. Just served as the editor-in-chief of the East German weekly Sonntag until 1957. That year, he was arrested for anti-constitutional activities ("inciting to boycott") for his involvement with the writing of articles critical of the regime. At the trial, prosecutor Ernst Melsheimer read out the contents of his diary, which had been uncovered by the Stasi, to the court. The captain of Just's unit had asked him and the nearly 20 other soldiers in his platoon to carry out the executions. When nobody came forward, the captain threatened to choose the shooters himself. Just and five other soldiers promptly volunteered.

Janka was found guilty, along with Walter Janka, Heinz Zöger, and Richard Wolf, and sentenced to four years in prison. He served a total of 45 months at Bautzen Prison, including two years in solitary confinement. However, he was never prosecuted for the incident specifically. Afterwards, Just said he was threatened that if he ever caused trouble again, he would be put on trial as a war criminal. After his release, Just became a prolific translator of primarily Czech but also Slovak works into German and was "rehabilitated" in 1990. Just served in the Brandenburg State Parliament (as its Alterspräsident, or "chairman by seniority") in the newly unified Germany until he was forced to resign in 1992, after confirming allegations from Stasi archives that he'd participated in wartime atrocities on the Eastern Front during the war.

Just claimed that he'd been forced to participate in the executions under the threat of death. However, testimony and documents in his files confirmed he and the other soldiers had volunteered to carry out the executions. Heinz Galinski, the chairman of the Central Council of Jews in Germany, demanded further investigation and a criminal prosecution against Just. However, no charges were filed. At the time, there was controversy over allegations that the Social Democrat government of Manfred Stolpe in Brandenburg had known about Just's past for several years, but remained silent. Several of his colleagues had urged him not to resign, claiming the time that he spent in prison atoned for his past.

In 1998 he received the Johann-Heinrich-Voß-Preis für Übersetzung.

== Publications ==
- Zeuge in eigener Sache: Die fünfziger Jahre in der DDR, Berlin: Luchterhand, Morgenbuch, 1990.
- Witness in His Own Cause: The Fifties in the German Democratic Republic, Lanham, MD: University Press of America, 1995.
- Deutsch, Jahrgang 1921: Ein Lebensbericht, Potsdam: Verlag für Berlin und Brandenburg, 2001.
