= Lajos von Sipeki-von Balás =

Hungarian modern pentathlete (1913–2003)

Personal information
- Born: 6 October 1913 Sopron, Hungary
- Died: 27 July 2003 (aged 89) Kistarcsa, Hungary

Sport
- Sport: Modern pentathlon

Lajos von Sipeki-von Balás (6 October 1913 – 27 July 2003) was a Hungarian modern pentathlete. He competed at the 1936 Summer Olympics.
