= Harich Group =

Harich Group (Gruppe Harich) was the originally derogatory name given by the East German justice and media establishments to the defendants in a high-profile 1957 criminal trial against a "circle of like minded persons".

Wolfgang Harich was a leading member of The Group: he was also a man whose name had been on the list of potentially helpful supporters that Walter Ulbricht brought with him from Moscow on 2 May 1945 when he arrived on his nation building mission. Two days later, invited to join Ulbricht's team, Harich had firmly declined, while nevertheless expressing his willingness to make his contribution in the cultural field and in journalism.

== Background ==
During the de-Stalinization period, and particularly after First-secretary Khrushchev's "secret" speech of February 1956, in which he criticized Stalin, discussion groups developed spontaneously in Poland, Hungary and in East Germany, comprising Marxist intellectuals, and calling for reforms from within The Party that were, for the most part, aligned with the national objectives of the communist states.

The "Bloch circle" (focused on Ernst Bloch), met together in Leipzig. In Berlin there was a "circle of like minded persons" centred on Walter Janka and Gustav Just. There was also a "Thursday circle" around Fritz J. Raddatz and there was another group around the sculptor Fritz Cremer.

The most important of these discussion groups was identified as the "circle of like minded persons", which for the most part comprised employees and authors of the country's leading publishing house, Aufbau-Verlag, and of the weekly newspaper "Sonntag" ("Sunday"). Contacts existed between Georg Lukács in Hungary, Ernst Bloch in Leipzig, Paul Merker and Johannes R. Becher (known as the author of East Germany's recently adopted national anthem). Wolfgang Harich was mandated to summarize the discussion groups' conclusions on paper. In this way, Harich composed the "Platform for the special German route to Socialism". Key demands were as follows:

- Replacement of Walter Ulbricht as party boss and head of state, and of several other named political leaders including the state prosecutor, Ernst Melsheimer who later played a leading role in the affair,
- Free elections, freedom of expression and government under the rule of law,
- Full sovereignty for the German Democratic Republic and the withdrawal of Soviet troops,
- Economic reforms designed to increase personal responsibility of producers,
- A coming together of East Germany's ruling SED and West Germany's SPD (political parties) so as to create the conditions for:
- Reunification of Germany as a neutral demilitarized state with a socialist stamp.

The "Platform" document was intended to serve as the basis for comprehensive discussions within the party, and would be published in the SED's theory journal, Einheit (Unity). However, Harich handed a copy to Georgi Pushkin, the Soviet ambassador in Berlin, in the hope of receiving his support against the unreformed Stalinist national leader, Walter Ulbricht. Pushkin told Ulbricht about it. In a face to face conversation, Ulbricht warned Harich against further activity. Harich, however, shared the document with employees of the East Germany office of the (West German) SPD, and with Rudolf Augstein, the hands-on proprietor-editor of West Germany's Der Spiegel magazine. West German media duly published the contents of the "Platform" document.

== Arrests and trials ==
On 29 November 1956 Harich, Bernhard Steinberger and a journalist called Hertwig were arrested. Janka was arrested a week later on 6 December. The journalist Heinz Zöger and the radio commentator Richard Wolf attended the first part of the show trial that ensued in March 1957 in order to testify on behalf of Harich. Zöger and Wolf were arrested on 18 March 1957 in the court room as "participants in the counter revolutionary group" of Wolfgang Harich.

Two show trials took place at the Supreme Court in Berlin in March and July 1957. Six men were convicted of creating a conspiratorial group of counter revolutionary enemies of the state. (Bildung einer konspirativ-staatsfeindlichen/konterrev. Gruppe) and sentenced.

=== A verdict on behalf of the state ===
In summing up his case, the state prosecutor, Ernst Melsheimer condemned the lead defendant with studied passion:

"I believe that in my pleadings I have spelled out clearly enough the character of Harich, in all his cowardice and anxiety, in all his self-serving ambition and in all his overbearing arrogance. He deserves a heavy sentence. For Harich a re-education process lasting many years is necessary."

=== Sentencing ===
- Wolfgang Harich received a ten-year prison sentence.
- Walter Janka received a five-year prison sentence.
- Gustav Just and Bernhard Steinberger each received a four-year prison sentence.
- Richard Wolf received a three-year prison sentence.
- Heinz Zöger received a two and a half year prison sentence.
- Manfred Hertwig received a two-year prison sentence.

=== Contrasting reactions from the sentenced men ===
Harich, possibly sarcastically, repented and thanked the investigators:

"It is clear to me that the Security Services deserve to be thanked for preserving our state from greater damage [...]. In other words, I would have become unstoppable. I was like a burned out horse that has become unresponsive to restraint. I had been taken over with these ideas in my head, and if I had not been arrested when I was, then I would have been fit not merely for the ten year sentence that the state prosecutor has recommended, but for the gallows. Therefore I also offer my personal thanks to the Security Services.

Irrespective of what lay behind Harich's overblown contrition, it stood in stark contrast to the reaction of Walter Janka. The former friends remained unreconciled for the rest of their lives. Addressing the court, Janka resolutely declared his innocence:

"The explanation that I wish to give out concerns the characterizations [made by the prosecutor... ] that I have become a hater of Worker-and-Farmer-power, that I have betrayed my party, that I have knowingly struggled for, followed or supported deceitful plans, conspiratorial plans, counter-revolutionary plans to restore capitalism.

I declare [ ... ] that it is wholly incorrect to assert that I became or ever could have been a hater of and a traitor to Worker-and-Farmer-power. For almost 30 of my 43 years I have been part of the Working Class and committed to the Communist Movement. [ ... ] It is not too much to say that I would rather been torn to pieces than compromise with Capitalism by so much as a hand's breadth."

=== Silent witnesses ===
The trials were attended by representatives of the country's cultural elite, including Anna Seghers, Helene Weigel and Willi Bredel.
