= Helmut Lehmann (politician) =

German politician (1882–1959)

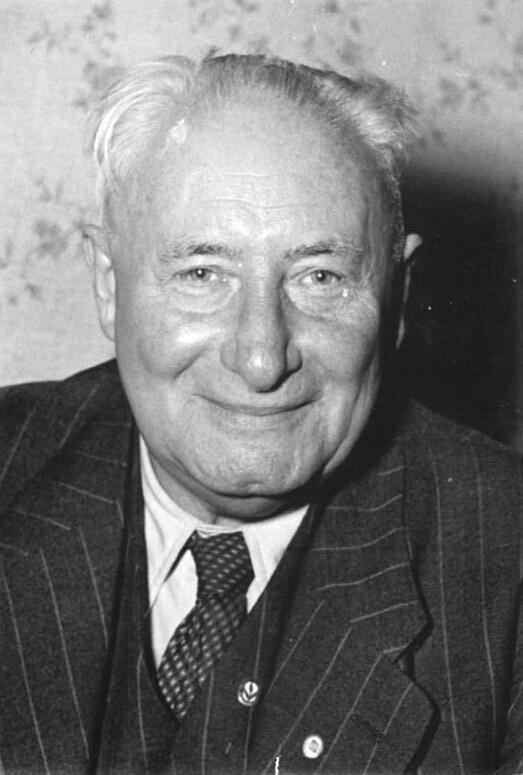
Portrait by Gustav Köhler, 1952

Helmut Erich Johannes Lehmann (1 December 1882 – 9 February 1959) was a German politician (SPD/SED).

== Life ==
Helmut Lehmann was born in Berlin. His father was a writer. He attended school in Strasbourg and Berlin and then between 1897 ad 1899, undertook an apprenticeship in carpentry at Schöneiche, a small town just outside Berlin on its eastern side. Between 1900 and 1903 he was employed first as an assistant in a lawyer's office and then with a health insurance organisation (Krankenkasse). In 1900 he joined the national office workers' trades union ("Zentralverband der Büroangestellten") and from then till 1900 was also working as a trades union official at the union's Berlin office.

In 1903 Lehmann joined the Social Democratic Party ("Sozialdemokratische Partei Deutschlands" / SPD). In 1903 he became a department head at the AOK health insurance office at Berlin where he worked, a position he retained till 1907. In 1904 he established and became chairman of the League for Apprentices and Young Workers in Prussia. Between 1905 and 1913 he contributed as an editor to the "Deutsche Angestellte Zeitung" ("German Clerical Workers' Newspaper") and he was also active as an author and producer of publications for the health insurance organisation. During these years, between 1907 and 1914, he was secretary for the Union of Office Workers ("Verband der Büroangestellten").

In 1918/19, during the year of revolutions that followed national military defeat, Lehmann participated as a member of the Soldiers' and Workers' Soviet in Dresden.

Between 1914 and 1924 he was secretary of the National Association of German Health Insurance Organisations, based at one stage in Dresden, moving on to serve as the Berlin-based executive chairman of the National Association between 1924 and 1933. The position meant that he was able to exercise a powerful influence over the development and expansion of Germany's health insurance system, and he also became increasingly influential as a social policy strategist within the SPD, of which he had been an active member since 1903.

Everything changed in January 1933 when the Nazis took power and lost no time in transforming Germany into a one-party dictatorship. Although Communist activists were at the top of the government hit list, others with a record of activism in the SPD and the union movement also attracted the attention of the authorities. Lehmann was deprived of his offices and almost at once arrested, spending time in government detention during March/April 1933. In June 1935 he was again taken into "investigative custody", identified as the leader of a resistance group in Berlin comprising members of illegal organisations: Social Democrats and Trades Unionists. A few years later the assassination plot against Hitler failed in its primary objective but succeeded in making the government acutely nervous. They dusted down a pre-prepared plan and on the night of 22/23 August 1944 mass arrests took place across Germany in an exercise identified as "Aktion Gitter". What the people arrested had in common was that before 1933 they had been listed as active politically, usually as members of the Communist Party, the SPD or the trades union movement. Many of those sought, especially Communists, had long since fled abroad. Others had died, sometimes simply of old age. But that still left more than 4,000 who were arrested: Hans Lehmann was one of these. In January 1945 the special People's Court sentenced him to a year in prison for "Backing the enemy" ("Feindbegünstigung").

He was released from Berlin's Tegel Penitentiary on 22 April 1945 as the Soviet army took possession of what remained of the city. The end of the war marked a return for Lehmann to mainstream politics in what was administered, between May 1945 and October 1949, as the Soviet occupation zone. During May and June 1945 Lehmann worked with the economy department in the Berlin municipal quarters of Pankow and Wedding. Then, through July 1945, he served as deputy chief of the Social Security Establishment for Greater Berlin, a position from which he moved on to create the National Administration for Labour and Welfare Affairs ("Zentralverwaltung für Arbeit und Sozialfürsorge") in the zone relaunched, in October 1949, as the Soviet sponsored German Democratic Republic, retaining responsibility within that organisation as a vice-president of it till 1950.

In June 1945 Lehmann became a member of the SPD party central committee. He was one of those participating in the party conference of April 1946 at which the SPD and the Communist Party voted, applying processes that would remain contentious, for a merger which resulted in the creation of a new party, the Socialist Unity Party ("Sozialistische Einheitspartei Deutschlands" / SED). The architects of the process evidently hoped to find a way for the merger to apply across the four occupation zones into which the western two thirds of Germany had been divided in 1945, but in the event the party merger only took effect in the Soviet occupation zone, and by the time the Soviet zone was relaunched as the German Democratic Republic the SED was well on the way to becoming the ruling party in a new kind of German one-party dictatorship. From the outset Helmut Lehmann was a senior figure within the new party, appointed to the Party Executive in 1946, and remaining a member between 1949 and his death in 1959 after the Party Executive became the Party Central Committee. Under the Leninist constitutional structure being created, power rested not with any parliament or government ministers but with the party central committee, though the fact that the same individuals were frequently members of more than one of the institutions involved made the Central Committee's dominance less stark than it might otherwise have been. Not all Central Committee members carried equal weight. The Central Committee was directed by the country's leadership through its Politburo. Lehmann was a Politburo member during 1949/50. Working in a commission chaired by Anton Ackermann, he was one of those who worked on drafting the basic principles and objectives of the new party.

The focus of Lehmann's political interest remained, as it has been before 1933, social welfare, and several of his additional appointments reflected this. In 1946 he was appointed president of Volkssolidarität ("People's Solidarity"), an organisation for older citizens integrated, like various other official mass organisations, into the national political power structure in a supportive capacity. He was chairman between 1950 and 1958/1959 of the National Executive for Social Insurance ("Zentralvorstandes der Sozialversicherung"). One authoritative source defined his role more succinctly as being "Head of Social Insurance" ("Chef der DDR-Sozialversicherung"). He also held senior positions in the Trades Union Federation.

At a regional level he sat as a member of the Landtag of Thuringia between 1946 and 1949. At the national level, during 1949/50 he was a member of the provisional national parliament ("Volkskammer"). According to some sources he then remained a Volkskammer member till his death in 1959.

== Awards and honours ==
- 1953 Order of Karl Marx
- 1953 Hero of Labour
- 1957 Patriotic Order of Merit in gold

After his death various East German entities were renamed in his honour including a Trades Union holiday village at Johanngeorgenstadt. In 1982 his face appeared on a postage stamp.

== Output (as an example) ==
From Der sozialistische Arzt:

- Reform der Reichsversicherungsordnung
  Main themes of Helmut Lehmann's address to the Fourth Breslau Health Insurance Conference ("Leitsätze des Referenten Helmut Lehmann auf dem Breslauer Krankenkassentag. IV")
