= Walter Janka =

German author and publisher (1914–1994)

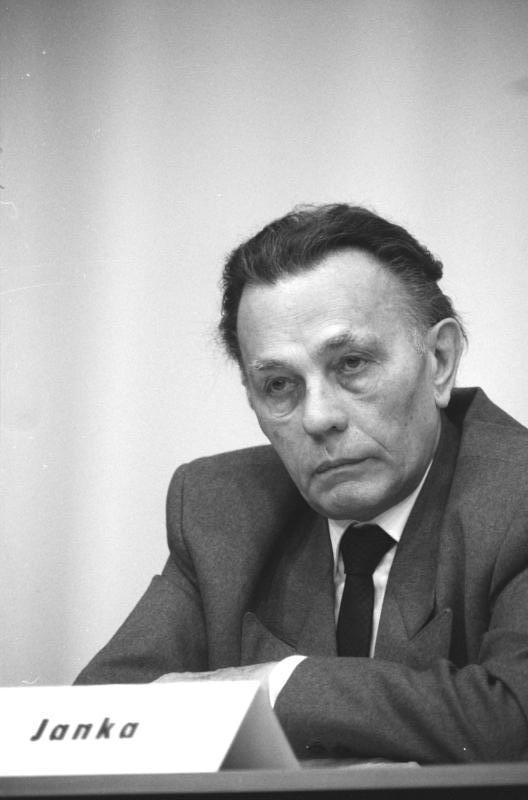
- Janka at the Extraordinary Party Congress of the Socialist Unity Party of Germany (SED) in East Berlin, December 1989
- Born: 29 April 1914; Kleinmachnow, Province of Brandenburg, Kingdom of Prussia, German Empire
- Died: 17 March 1994 (aged 79); Berlin, Germany
- Occupation: Publisher
- Political party: KPD (before 1946); SED (1946–1956, 1972–1989); PDS (after 1989)
- Spouse: Charlotte Scholz (m. 1947)
- Children: André; Yvonne
- Relatives: Albert Janka
- Military career
- Allegiance: Spanish Republic
- Branch: International Brigades
- Service years: 1936–1939
- Rank: Battalion Commander
- Unit: XI International Brigade
- Commands: Thälmann Battalion
- Conflicts: Spanish Civil War; Battle of the Ebro (WIA)

Walter Janka (29 April 1914 – 17 March 1994) was a German communist, political activist and writer-turned-publisher who served as a battalion commander in the International Brigades during the Spanish Civil War.

Janka is notable for having spent time incarcerated as a political prisoner in both Nazi and East Germany, in the latter under suspicion of counter-revolutionary activities, in both cases serving most of his sentence at Bautzen prison.

== Biography ==
=== Early years ===
Walter Janka was one of six children born to a tool and die maker called Adalbert Janka. He attended junior school from 1920 till 1928. Between 1928 and 1932 he undertook a type setting apprenticeship.

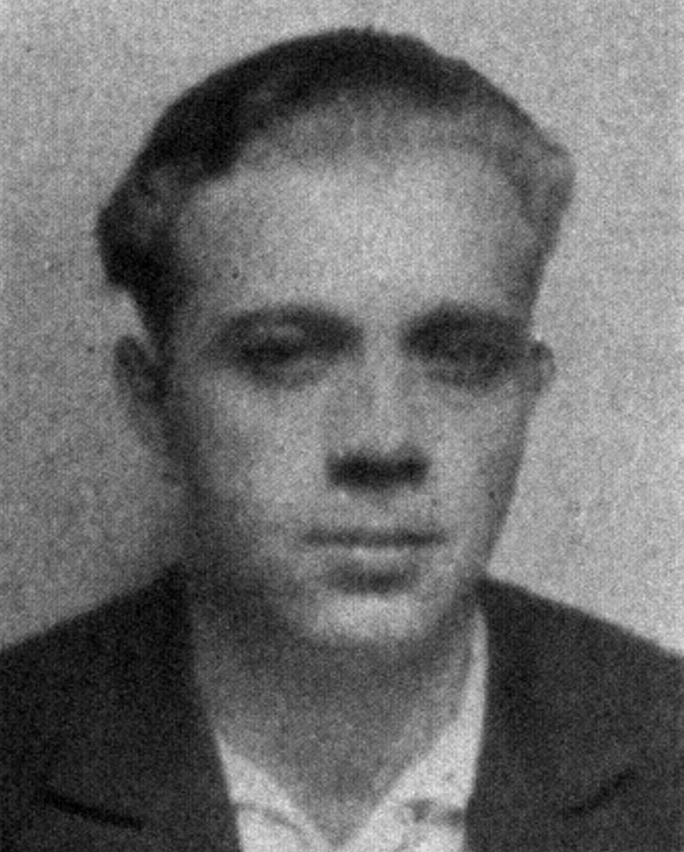
Janka's brother Albert's official Reichstag portrait, 1932

In 1930 Janka became an Organisation Leader, and then a Political Leader of the Young Communists (KJVD / Kommunistischer Jugendverband Deutschlands) for the Chemnitz sub-region. After his elder brother Albert, the youngest member of the Reichstag, had been murdered by the Nazis, Walter himself was imprisoned by the Gestapo. He was remanded to custody in Chemnitz and in Freiberg before being tried and convicted under German law of preparing to commit high treason (German: Hochverrat). After 1½ years of imprisonment in Bautzen prison, he spent a six-month term in Sachsenburg concentration camp. Finally, in 1935 he was deported to Czechoslovakia.

=== Civil war in Spain, internment in France, exile in Mexico ===
In 1936 Janka went to Spain to join the Thälmann Battalion and fight in the Spanish Civil War. In 1937 he became a Captain, and shortly after that, in the Karl Marx Division, he became the youngest Major, and then a Battalion Commander, in the International Brigade of the Spanish Republican Army.

During a 1991 interview with German-American journalist and retired U.S. intelligence official John O. Koehler, Janka, recalled his encounters in Spain with fellow KPD exile and future East German Secret police chief Erich Mielke. During the winter of 1936, Janka was summoned by the Servicio de Investigación Militar, the political police of the Second Spanish Republic, and personally interrogated by Mielke. Mielke demanded to know why Janka had voluntarily traveled from Czechoslovakia to Spain rather than being assigned there by the Party. When he told Mielke to get lost, the SIM demoted Janka back to the ranks and then expelled him from the International Brigade. Decades later, Janka told Koehler, "While I was fighting at the front, shooting at the Fascists, Mielke served in the rear, shooting Trotskyites and Anarchists."

During the second part of 1938, Janka was badly wounded during the Battle of the Ebro.

After the Nationalist faction won the war, Janka fled to the Third French Republic, where he was interned between 1939 and 1941 at Camp Vernet. He then escaped via Casablanca in November 1941, and ending up in exile in Mexico, where together with Paul Merker and Alexander Abusch he founded the "Free Germany" ("Freies Deutschland") movement and contributed to the anti-Nazi movement in German literature known as Exilliteratur.

In Mexico he ran the publishing business "El Libro Libre", which also employed fellow exiled German writer Anna Seghers. In 1946 Janka took over leadership of the Mexican section of the German Communist Party (KPD) in exile.

=== Back in Germany ===
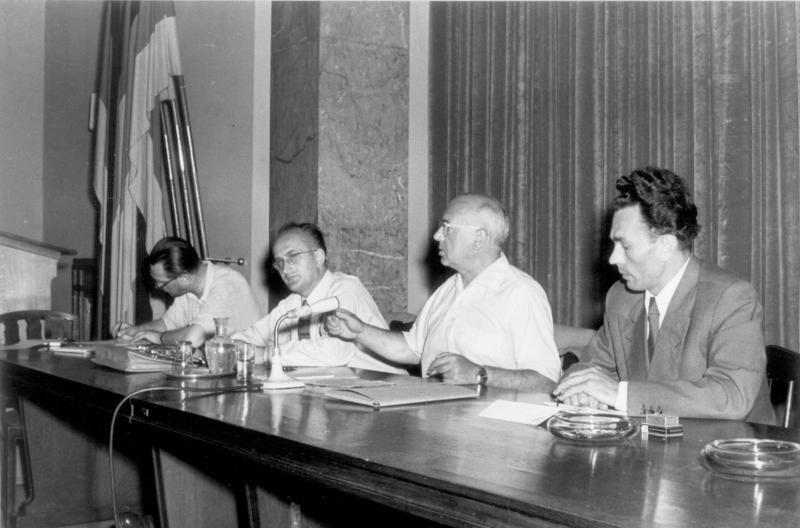
Janka (far right) at a press conference in East Berlin, 20 July 1955

After the end of the Second World War Janka returned, in April 1947, to what was Soviet occupation zone, later to become German Democratic Republic in 1949. In 1947 he married his long-standing partner, a translator called Charlotte (Lotte) Scholz. The couples' two children, André and Yvonne, were born in 1948 and 1950.

After a brief period working with the leadership of the SED (Socialist Unity Party of Germany/Sozialistische Einheitspartei Deutschlands) he joined the board of DEFA, the state-owned film studio. He was appointed managing director on 6 October 1948. He was replaced in the top job in 1949, but remained on the executive board till 1950.

In February 1950 he became Deputy Director of the Berlin-based Aufbau-Verlag, then the country's leading publishing house, moving up to the top job in 1953. During this time he planned a project to make a film based on Thomas Mann's novel of dynastic decline, Buddenbrooks, which was to be a collaboration between East Germany's DEFA and West German film companies. Another ambition, in pursuit of which he met Charlie Chaplin near the latter's home at Vevey in May 1954, was a DEFA film with Charlie Chaplin as the leading star.

=== Trial and imprisonment ===
On 6 December 1956 Janka was arrested on a charge of counter-revolutionary conspiracy and held in the Berlin-Hohenschönhausen Remand Prison. By March 1957 he had become one of six men arrested and held in respect of the alleged conspiracy. Janka remained in the Berlin-Hohenschönhausen prison for more than half a year before being charged in the Supreme Court, on 26 July 1957, with "being directly behind, and participating in, a counter-revolutionary group" (known as the Harich Group), He was sentenced to a further five years in prison, with "enhanced solitary confinement" ("verschärfter Einzelhaft").

The trial took place under conditions of tight security. The Justice Minister Hilde Benjamin herself appeared as a prosecution witness. No defense witnesses were permitted. State prosecutor, Ernst Melsheimer successfully threatened Janka's friend, Paul Merker who had himself only recently been "rehabilitated" (released from prison) in respect of an earlier matter, and who was now called upon to testify against Janka, with the words:

"Be under no illusions, that you really belong on the docket. You are separated by a hair's breadth from the traitor Janka. You belong beside him. And if you do not here speak truthfully, then you must expect to take your place beside him on the docket."

Wolfgang Harich had already been convicted, and sentenced to a ten-year jail term in March 1957, in respect of the same alleged conspiracy as Janka. The two had previously worked together at the Aufbau publishing house. Harich was brought into the July show-trial by judge Walter Ziegler as a leading prosecution witness: his testimony now heavily implicated Janka. The two former friends would remain estranged from one another for the rest of their lives.

Janka served the first part of his sentence in Berlin-Hohenschönhausen prison where he had been held on remand, but in 1958 he was transferred to Bautzen prison where he fell seriously ill. He later wrote of this time how his mind wandered back to the Nazi years when he had been incarcerated in the same place. As the authorities refused to repair the heater in his cell, he recalled sitting here more than twenty years earlier, in the big prison complex on the edge of the city which the townsfolk nicknamed "the yellow misery", because all the buildings were built with the same cheap yellow stone.

=== Rehabilitation ===
On 23 December 1960 Janka was released from prison before completing the original term of his sentence, following international protests. An initial period of unemployment lasted till 1962, after which he was worked again in film with the DEFA film studio as a dramaturge based in Kleinmachnow on the southern fringe Berlin where he had had a home since the 1950s.

During the 1960s, working with other writers, Janke developed scenarios and screen-plays for the DEFA. He was heavily involved with the much acclaimed film, Goya or the Hard Way to Enlightenment ("Goya – oder der arge Weg der Erkenntnis") (1971). However, out of regard for his record of "political activism", recognition that came his way remained unpublicized.

In 1972 his official recognition as a Victim of the Nazi regime (Verfolgter des Naziregimes / VdN) was reinstated, and he was accepted back into the ruling SED. However, his autobiographical coloured scenes from his "Journey to Gandesa" about his experiences of the Battle of the Ebro during the Spanish Civil War remained unfilmed, and he terminated his contract with DEFA in 1973, having retired from it in 1972.

During the 1980s Janka wrote articles, traveled several times to West Germany and gave lectures about his experiences in the Spanish Civil War. Finally, barely more than six months before the fall of the Berlin wall, on 1 May 1989 he was awarded the Patriotic Order of Merit (Gold/first class) "in recognition of outstanding services to the creation and development of socialist society in the German Democratic Republic".

=== The Wende and post-reunification ===
As the end of the German Democratic Republic approached, Janka's memoir of his 1956 arrest and subsequent imprisonment was published, in October 1989, by Rowohlt Verlag under the wry title "Difficulties with the truth" ("Schwierigkeiten mit der Wahrheit"). Janka suddenly found himself very popular. As German reunification appeared unstoppable, on 4 and 5 January 1990 the Supreme Court met in open session and annulled their 1957 judgement against him. At the same time a legal and journalistic dispute flared between Janka and Wolfgang Harich about the details of those 1957 show trials.

Janka's contribution to dramaturgy received recognition in the form of the Heinrich Greif Prize in 1990.

On 16 December 1989 Janka was a member of the presidium at the Special Party Congress of the SED (then in the process of transforming itself into the PDS / Party of Democratic Socialism / Partei des Demokratischen Sozialismus) held in Berlin at the Dynamo Sports Hall.

In 1990 he was a member of the "Council of Elders" of the new PDS, but he soon became disappointed with this, and quit.

== Death ==
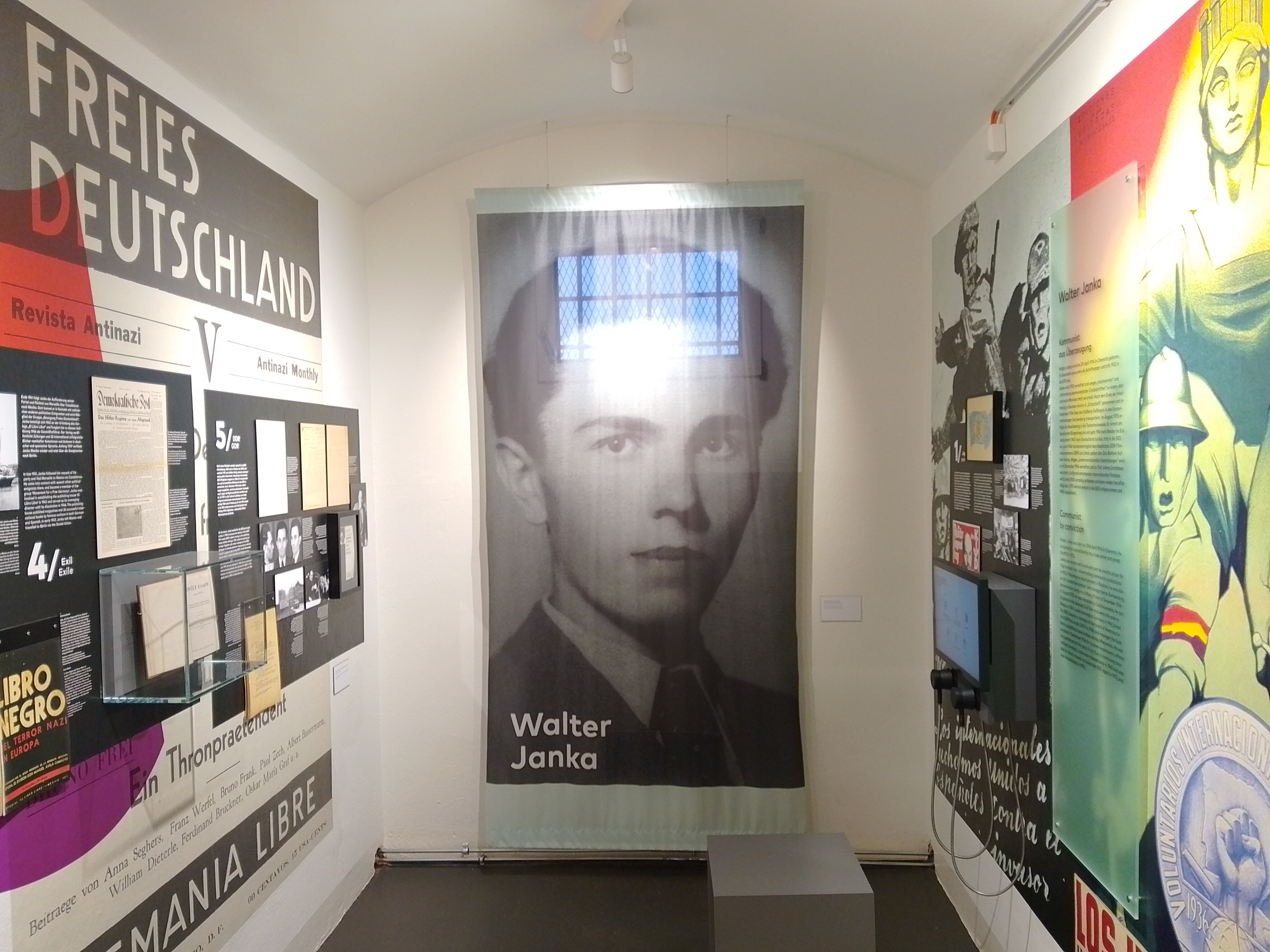
A biographical exhibition dedicated to Janka at the Kaßberg Prison in Chemnitz, 20 May 2025

Janka died in March 1994 in Kleinmachnow and is buried there in the Waldfriedhof (Cemetery in the woods).

== Publications ==
- Janka, W.:Schwierigkeiten mit der Wahrheit. Essay, Rowohlt Taschenbuch Verlag, 1989, ISBN 3-499-12731-8
- Janka, W.:Spuren eines Lebens, Berlin: Rowohlt 1991
- Janka, W.:... bis zur Verhaftung. Erinnerungen eines deutschen Verlegers. Berlin, Weimar: Aufbau-Verlag 1993
