= Kistarcsa =

- Town
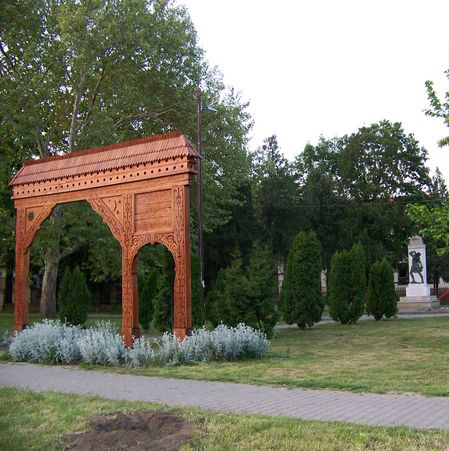
- Székely gate in Kistarcsa

- Flag Coat of arms

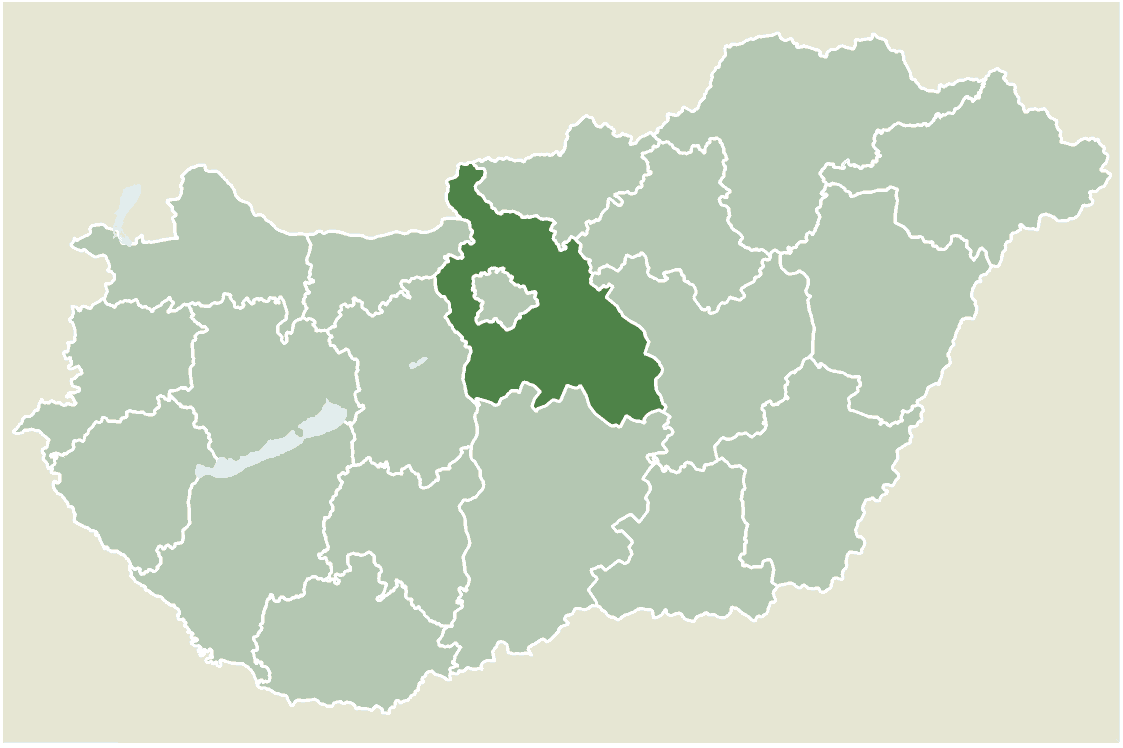
- Location of Pest county in Hungary

- Location in Hungary
- Coordinates: 47°32′52″N 19°15′48″E
- Country: Hungary
- County: Pest
- District: Gödöllő

Area
  - Total: 11.02 km^{2} (4.25 sq mi)

Population (2017)
  - Total: 12,645
  - Density: 1,147/km^{2} (2,972/sq mi)
- Time zone: UTC+1 (CET)
  - Summer (DST): UTC+2 (CEST)
- Postal code: 2143
- Area code: (+36) 28
- Website: kistarcsa.asp.lgov.hu

Kistarcsa (Hungarian: [ˈkiʃtɒrt͡ʃɒ]) is a town in Pest County, Budapest metropolitan area, Hungary.

A site of the Kistarcsa concentration camp during the Holocaust. Later an internment camp of State Protection Authority for political prisoners during the 1950s.

== History ==
Only a few archaeological excavations were held on the territory of Kistarcsa; the earliest findings are from the Neolithic Era (4000–2500 BC). From this time it was always a populated area: Celts, Vandals, Alans, Sarmatas and Avars lived here. After the fall of the Avar Empire the Magyars found an underpopulated area, so they could settle down easily. Their settlement can be dated back to the 10th to 13th centuries according to the excavated area next to the cemetery of Kistarcsa.

== Notable people ==
- Bernadett Baczkó, judoka
- Jane Haining, Scottish Church of Scotland missionary
- László Háry, major general, aviator and a Commander of the First Independent Hungarian Air Force
- Zoltán Meszlényi, martyr bishop
- József Simándy, tenor
- Lajos von Sipeki-von Balás, modern pentathlete
- Krisztina Szádvári, handballer

== Twin towns – sister cities ==
Kistarcsa is twinned with:

- Beluša, Slovakia
- Fanchykovo, Ukraine
- Milovice, Czech Republic
- Radomyśl nad Sanem, Poland
- Turia, Romania
