= Wolfgang Harich =

German journalist and communist philosopher (1923–1995)

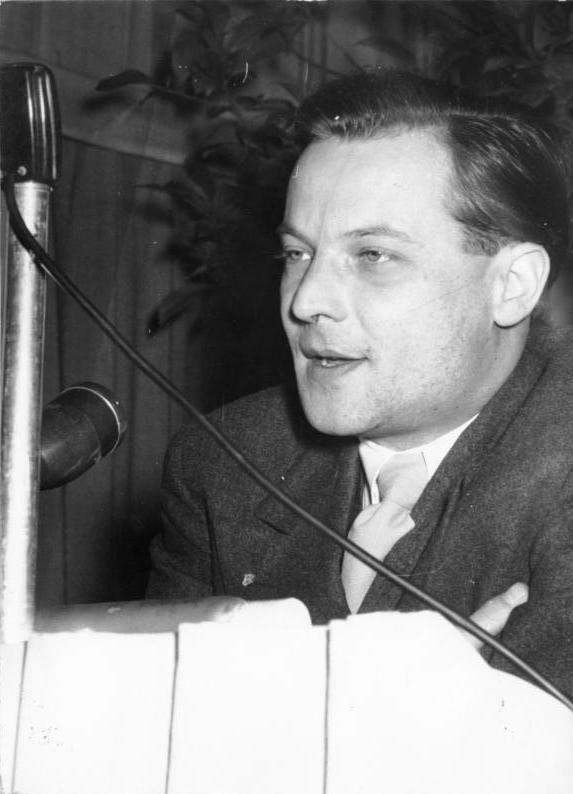
- Born: Wolfgang Harich; 9 December 1923; Königsberg, Germany
- Died: 15 March 1995 (aged 71); Berlin, Germany
- Occupation: Writer
- Writing career
- Period: 1950s–1990s
- Notable awards: Heinrich Mann Prize; 1953

Wolfgang Harich (9 December 1923 – 15 March 1995) was a communist philosopher and journalist in East Germany.

A deserter from the German army in World War II and a member of the Socialist Unity Party of Germany, Harich became a professor of philosophy at Humboldt University in 1949. He was arrested in 1956 and sentenced to ten years in prison for the "establishment of a conspiratorial counterrevolutionary group." He was released in 1964, after eight years, and rehabilitated in 1990. In 1994 he joined the Party of Democratic Socialism.

His grave is preserved in the Protestant Friedhof III der Jerusalems- und Neuen Kirchengemeinde (Cemetery No. III of the congregations of Jerusalem's Church and New Church) in Berlin-Kreuzberg, south of Hallesches Tor.

== Life ==
Wolfgang Harich was born in Königsberg, East Prussia, on 9 December 1923, into an upper-class literary educated family. His father was a writer Walter Harich and his mother was Anne-Lise Wyneken, the daughter of Alexander Wyneken, editor in chief of the Königsberger Allgemeine Zeitung.

Harich became known as one of the stronger voices in post war debates at a very young age in Germany. He firmly believed in uniting war torn Germany. He studied philosophy at the Humboldt University of Berlin and, upon graduation, became professor of philosophy and taught at the same university. His strong voice eventually led him to be sentenced to imprisonment for ten years for conspiracy. Although he only served eight years, Harich was kept in solitary confinement for more than seven of those eight years, which took a large toll on his mental health, giving him severe depression and dizziness. He emigrated to Austria in 1979, moved to West Germany in 1980, and returned to the Besseres Deutschland or "Better Germany" in 1981. Although he had a heart attack in July 1960, he fought through it and recovered, surviving until 15 March 1995, when he died at the age of 71.

== Education ==
Harich studied philosophy at Humboldt University in East Berlin with Nicolai Hartmann and Eduard Spranger, graduating in 1951. He began giving lectures in 1949 on Marxist Philosophy, and in 1952 he became the University's Professor of Philosophy. Before his final studies at Humboldt, he had entered the Kammer Der Kunst Schaffenden, Department of Creative Artists, in June 1945 as Paul Wegener's personal assistant. This experience gave him the ability to become considered as one of Berlin's best theater critics.

== Political views ==
Harich was a convinced communist and an environmentalist. He joined Kommunistische Partei Deutschlands (KPD), the Communist Party of Germany, then later joined Sozialistische Einheitspartei Deutschlands (SED), the Socialist Unity Party of Germany, which later became the ruling party of the German Democratic Republic (GDR), in 1946.

As a twenty-year-old, Harich was drafted into the Wehrmacht, but left and joined an anti-Nazi group in 1944. He was a Stalinist until the early 1950s; he wrote in a memoir of recalling "crying an ocean of tears over Stalin's death." Yet, after the removal of the Stalinists, he moved on to wanting a neutralized and united, democratic socialist Germany. His beliefs and principles were driven by self-transformation, and he was mostly interested in Marxist philosophy. Harich was looking for a "third way" between Stalinism and capitalism, he wanted a "humanistic socialism" in a reunified Germany. He established and engaged his friends, opponents, and social democrats in controversy in West Germany to argue that the GDR should make reforms to further the reunion of Germany. His sweeping reform proposals represented the only Party attempt at the internal restructuring of the GDR before it collapsed. He pushed for free elections, the admission of legal opposition groups, and the dissolution of the Stasi, the secret police of General Erich Mielke, leading others to often look at his ideas as Utopian, but was granted the title of "most brilliant head in the SED." Agreeing with Bloch and Lukács, Harich criticized Stalinism and believed in renewing Marxism from a humanist and naturalist point of view.

Harich produced a manifesto and presented his ideas in October–November 1956 to Georgy Pushkin, the Soviet ambassador and to Walter Ulbricht, the first secretary of the Socialist Unity Party, himself. This presentation and his notorious loose tongue led him to being convicted of "counterrevolutionary plotting," indicted with "formation of an enemy group" on behalf of the West German SPD, and branded a revisionist. He was arrested on 29 November 1956, indicted in March 1957 and sentenced to imprisonment in July 1957. He remained in jail until released in December 1964. Harich referred to his years in jail as his Rufmord, or reputation-murder, and felt guiltless because all he did was "just talk." He actually thanked the Stasi for their vigilance in arresting him, for without their attention, he would not have been given ten years in jail, and instead he would be looking at the noose. This quote of Harich's was recorded at his hearing,

I wish to deliver my thanks to the SSD … I've found that they are correct and decent … I had gotten completely out of control … I was a runaway horse, which no call could have stopped … If I hadn't been taken into custody, I wouldn't today be ready for 10 years, which the Herr Prosecutor has recommended, but only for the hangman, and therefore I thank the SSD for their alertness.

He had later testified against a former friend Walter Janka, head of the Aufbau Publishing Company, creating a new "text book" characterized enemy. "Janka vs. Harich: the worldly older man vs. the young genius, the practical man vs. the classically educated intellectual, the tough working-class war hero vs. the bourgeois academic utopian." Janka refused to ever meet Harich again after the trial, insisting that Harich's false testimony landed him three years in Bautzen, the most horrific jail for political criminals.

After being released from jail, Harich was allowed to resume his previous literary work and became an editor of Akademie Verlag in Berlin in 1965, even though it took 33 years for the court to pronounce him "rehabilitated" in April 1990. Having spent most of his time in jail in solitary confinement, Harich emerged in 1964 as a hard-line Stalinist and enthusiastic critic of all modernist experimentation, even labeling Friedrich Nietzsche as a "Nazi worshipper." and insisting that his legacy was nothing but "a giant trash bin." Harich focused on more environmental political problems in the 1970s. In 1975 he undertook an impractical campaign for a state communism in the service of environmental protection, in hopes of making some change. Also, after the Wende (change) in Germany in 1989, he became the chairman of the Alternative Enquete Komission (AEK) which conducted research on the history of the GDR, and aligned himself with the self-proclaimed Mikhail Gorbachev reform communists after 1990.

== Literary work ==
Harich became accomplished and created a name for himself at a very young age. He followed in his father's footsteps and became a Jean Paul scholar, writing two books dealing with Paul's epistemology and poetic vision, which are arguably his finest scholarship. In 1946, he worked for the newspaper of the soviet occupation regime, Tägliche Rundschau; and he was also a journalist for the French-licensed daily. He became editor-in-chief of the journal Deutsche Zeitschrift für Philosophie along with Arthur Baumgarten, Ernst Bloch, and Karl Schroter in 1953. In the same year, Harich also received the prestigious Heinrich Mann Prize for editing and journalism, conferred by the GDR Academy of Fine Arts. Upon his arrest, Der Spiegel devoted its cover story to Harich in 1956, stating that West German intellectuals regarded him highly and saying, "despite his youth, probably the only GDR intellectual capable of calling into question the current foundation of the communist state, the doctrine of hard-frozen Stalinism." They even called him "an intellectual phenomenon" and "a pure intellect on two feet." In the 1970s, Harich published Communism without Growth: Babeuf and the Club of Rome with Rowohlt Verlag, which argued that a neo-Stalinist state with dictatorial authority to enforce environmental standards could avert an ecological catastrophe.

== Publications ==
- Rudolf Haym und sein Herderbuch. Beiträge zur kritischen Aneignung des literaturwissenschaftlichen Erbes. Berlin: Aufbau-Verlag, 1955
- Jean Pauls Kritik des philosophischen Egoismus. Belegt durch Texte und Briefstellen Jean Pauls im Anhang. Frankfurt: Suhrkamp Verlag, 1968
- Zur Kritik der revolutionären Ungeduld. Eine Abrechnung mit dem alten und dem neuen Anarchismus. Basel: Edition Etcetera, 1971
- Jean Pauls Revolutionsdichtung. Versuch einer neuen Deutung seiner heroischen Romane. Berlin: Akademie-Verlag, 1974
- Kommunismus ohne Wachstum? Babeuf und der »Club of Rome«. Sechs Interviews mit Freimut Duve und Briefe an ihn. Reinbek bei Hamburg: Rowohlt, 1975
- Keine Schwierigkeiten mit der Wahrheit. Zur nationalkommunistischen Opposition 1956 in der DDR. Berlin: Dietz Verlag, 1993
- Nietzsche und seine Brüder. Schwedt: Kiro, 1994
- Ahnenpass. Versuch einer Autobiographie. Berlin: Schwarzkopf & Schwarzkopf, 1999
- Nicolai Hartmann. Leben, Werk, Wirkung. Würzburg: Königshausen und Neumann, 2000
- Nicolai Hartmann — Größe und Grenzen. Versuch einer marxistischen Selbstverständigung. Würzburg: Königshausen und Neumann, 2004
