= Aufbau Verlag =

German publisher

- Type: GmbH & Co. KG
- Industry: Publishing
- Genre: Publisher
- Founded: 1945
- Headquarters: Berlin, Germany
- Revenue: 12,500,000 ±1 (2015)
- Owner: Matthias Koch
- Website: https://www.aufbau-verlage.de/

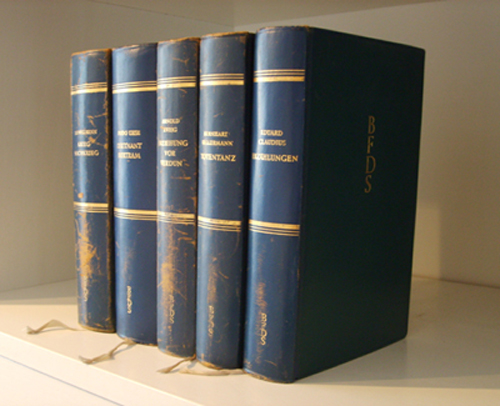
1951 book set published by Aufbau Verlag

Aufbau Verlag is a German publisher. It was founded in Berlin in 1945 and became the biggest publisher in East Germany (GDR). During that time it specialised in socialist and Russian literature.

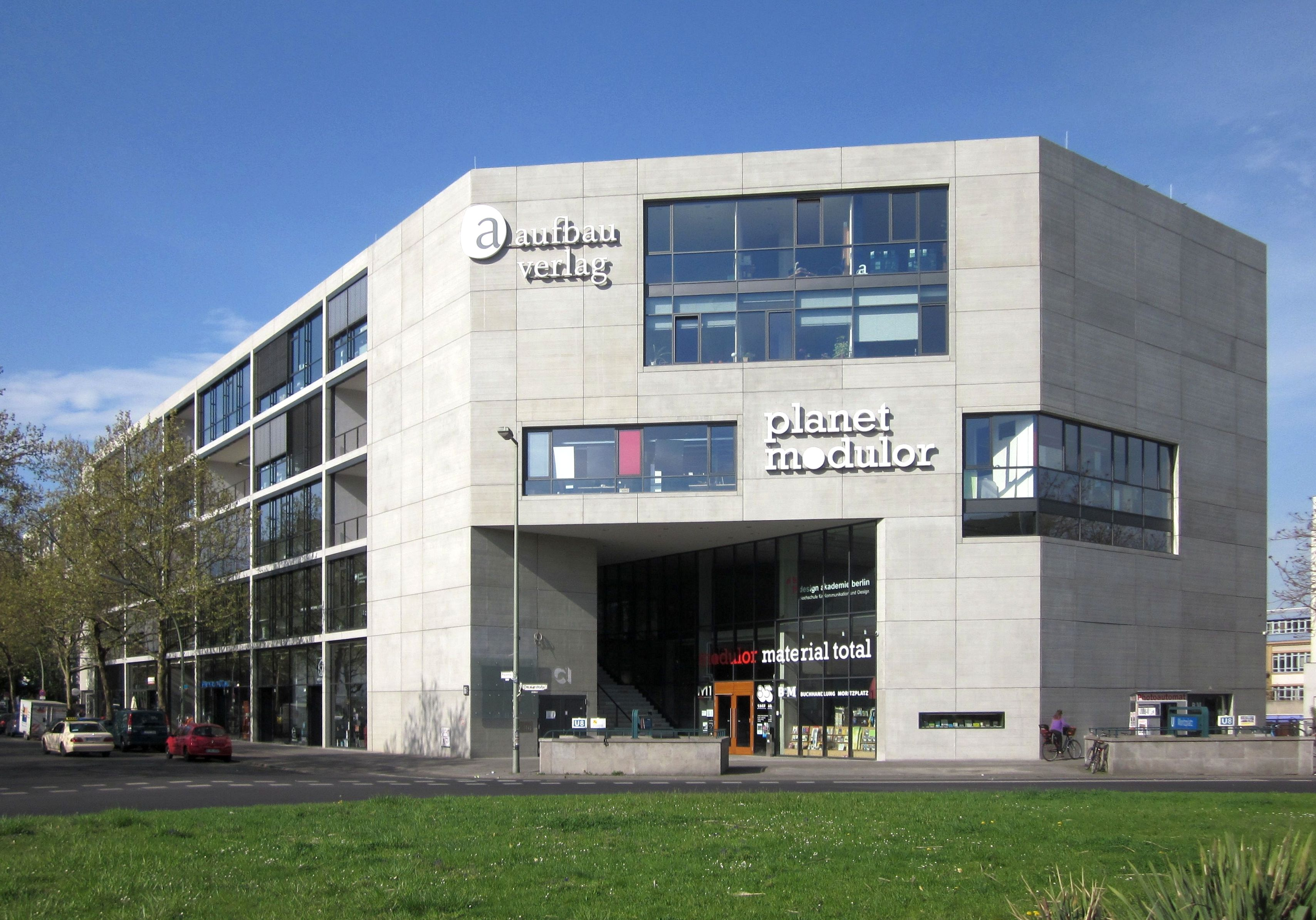
Aufbau-Haus at Prinzenstraße No. 85, corner of Moritzplatz (in the front), in Berlin-Kreuzberg

Aufbau Verlag (officially styled as aufbau verlag or Aufbau Verlag) is a German publishing house. Established in 1945 in Berlin on behalf of the Cultural Association for the Democratic Renewal of Germany (Kulturbund zur demokratischen Erneuerung Deutschlands e.V.), it quickly became the largest literary publisher in the German Democratic Republic (GDR). In its early years, the publisher focused on the humanistic traditions of German culture, specializing in exile and anti-fascist literature, along with works on literary and philosophical topics. Over time, its catalog expanded to include classical world literature and contemporary German works.

== History ==
=== Early years ===
On August 16, 1945, Kurt Wilhelm, Heinz Willmann, Klaus Gysi, and Otto Schiele founded the “Aufbau-Verlags-Gesellschaft mit beschränkter Haftung” as trustees on behalf of the recently established Kulturbund zur demokratischen Erneuerung Deutschlands. Wilhelm, a publishing bookseller, and Schiele, a publishing businessman, became the managing directors of the company. Paragraph 4 of the company agreement stipulated that the interests of the Kulturbund must be safeguarded as long as the organization's journals and sponsored publications were issued by Aufbau. In 1946, the Kulturbund e. V. acquired all shares of Aufbau-Verlag GmbH.

The license (No. 301) for the company was granted by the Soviet Military Administration in Germany (SMAD) two days later, on August 18, 1945. The military authority supported the publishing house and ensured the allocation of sufficient quantities of printing paper, which was difficult to procure after the Second World War.

=== After 1991 ===
On September 18, 1991, the real estate entrepreneur Bernd F. Lunkewitz purchased the shares of Aufbau Verlag GmbH i.A. as well as Rütten & Loening GmbH i.A. from the Treuhandanstalt.

However, since 1995, the publishing activities were significantly hindered by substantial uncertainties regarding ownership of the publishing house, particularly concerning publishing and copyright rights. In September 1994, statements by the Independent Commission for the Review of Party and Mass Organization Assets in the GDR raised suspicions that the privatization of the publishing houses by the Treuhandanstalt might have failed, suggesting that Aufbau Verlag was still owned by the Kulturbund, which was under the fiduciary management of the renamed Treuhandanstalt, now known as BvS.

After the BvS categorically denied this and rejected all claims, Lunkewitz subsequently purchased the shares of the original Aufbau Verlag GmbH, or rather the assets of Aufbau Verlag, and all associated compensation claims against the BvS directly from the Kulturbund. The subsequent legal proceedings against the BvS, the time required for these efforts, and the considerable costs severely impacted the publishing house.
