= Richard Staimer =

German politician (1907–1982)

Generalmajor Richard Staimer
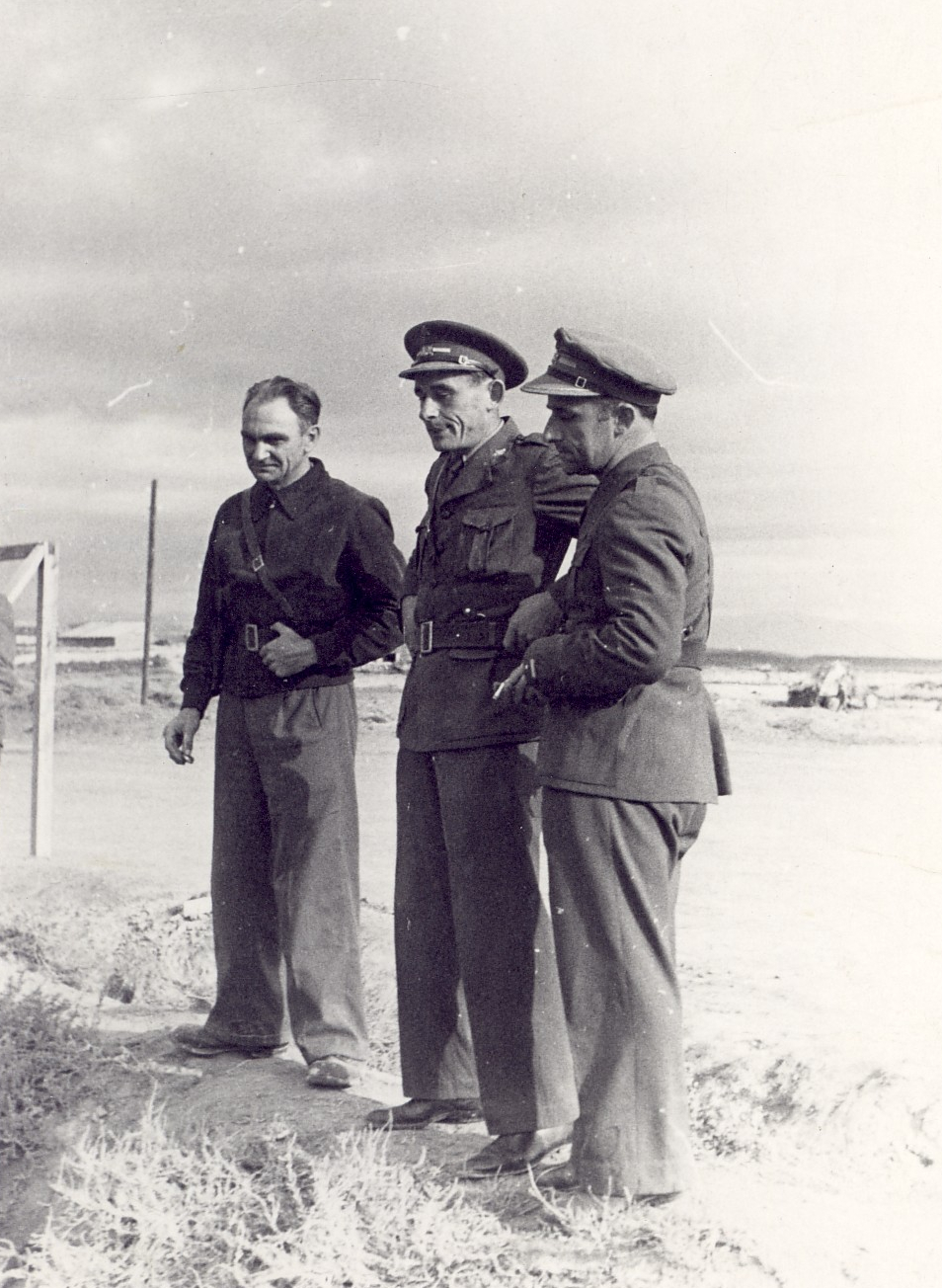
- Staimer (center) with Heinrich Rau (left) and Kurt Frank (right) in Spain c. 1937–1938

Chairman of the Gesellschaft für Sport und Technik
- In office 4 January 1955 – 27 February 1963
- Preceded by: Arno Berthold
- Succeeded by: Kurt Lohberger

Personal details
- Born: 25 January 1907 Munich, Kingdom of Bavaria, German Empire
- Died: 24 October 1982 (aged 75) East Berlin, East Germany
- Resting place: Zentralfriedhof Friedrichsfelde
- Party: KPD (1922–1946); SED (after 1946)
- Spouse: Eleonore Pieck (m. 1947; div. 1954)
- Parent: Josef Staimer (father)
- Relatives: Wilhelm Pieck (father-in-law)
- Education: Communist University of the National Minorities of the West
- Occupation: Politician; Military Officer; Trade Unionist; Tile Setter
- Awards: Patriotic Order of Merit; Order of Karl Marx

Military service
- Allegiance: Spanish Republic; East Germany
- Branch/service: International Brigades; Volkspolizei; National People's Army
- Years of service: 1936–1938; 1945–1952; 1963–1969
- Rank: Major; Inspector General; Generalmajor
- Commands: Thälmann Battalion; XI International Brigade; Berlin-Prenzlauer Berg Police; Brandenburg State Police; Leipzig Police Reserve; Military Training Department
- Battles/wars: Spanish Civil War

Richard Staimer (25 January 1907 – 24 October 1982) was a German communist politician, trade unionist and military officer who commanded the Thälmann Battalion and XI International Brigade in the Spanish Civil War, later serving as a Generalmajor in the National People's Army of the German Democratic Republic (East Germany). He held several positions in the GDR, including chairman of the Gesellschaft für Sport und Technik ("Sport and Technology Association") from 1955 to 1963.

== Biography ==
=== Early life and career ===
Richard Staimer was born in Munich on 25 January 1907, the son of former Munich Police President and trade union secretary Josef Staimer. After attending volksschule, he apprenticed as a tile setter from 1922 to 1925. He practiced this trade until 1931, during which time he traveled as a journeyman between 1927 and 1929 and worked in Switzerland and Austria in 1929/30. Influenced by his membership in a free proletarian children's group from 1920 onward, Staimer joined the Young Communist League of Germany (KJVD) at the start of his apprenticeship. In 1923, he belonged to the KJVD's military apparatus (M-Apparat) and its North Bavarian district leadership. In 1925, he became a member of the Communist Party of Germany (KPD). At the same time, he joined other communist organizations, such as the Rote Hilfe ("Red Aid"), the Revolutionäre Gewerkschafts Opposition ("Revolutionary Trade Union Opposition," RGO), and the Roter Frontkämpferbund ("Red Front Fighters' League," RFB).

In 1930, Staimer was expelled from Austria for his political activities. He found work as a construction worker in Nuremberg and became head of subversion activities within the police and the Reichswehr in the M-Apparat for Nuremberg, as well as district chairman of the German Construction Workers' Union. In 1931, he was sent by the Comintern to train at a military-political school in Moscow. From November 1931 to October 1932, he was district leader of the now-banned RFB of Northern Bavaria, and simultaneously a consultant and instructor for the KPD district leadership. Afterwards, he worked illegally in Berlin until February 1933. When Staimer faced charges of high treason in June 1933, he emigrated to the Soviet Union.

=== In exile ===
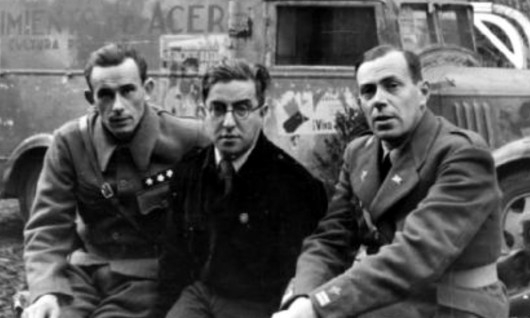
Staimer (left) with Mikhail Koltsov (center) and Hans Kahle (right) in Spain c. 1936–1937

After arriving in Moscow, Staimer became a student at the Julian Marchlewski Communist University of the National Minorities of the West. There he received the code name "Egon." After the outbreak of the Spanish Civil War and the formation of the International Brigades, Staimer went to Spain and took command of the Thälmann Battalion from December 1936 to February 1937. In April he was promoted to commander of the XI International Brigade, serving until December under the codename "General Hoffmann." During this time, Staimer was rumored to have been involved in the death of commissar Hans Beimler, although this hasn't been definitively proven.

Having risen to the rank of Major, Staimer returned to Moscow in January 1938. From February 1939, he was deployed to Western Europe. He initially stayed in Paris in March/April 1939 and then illegally went to Switzerland on behalf of the KPD. On 7 December 1939, Staimer was arrested in Basel and interned in Switzerland for over a year, most of that time in the St. Gallen prison. Furthermore, from the beginning of 1941, he was on the Gestapo's special wanted list "USSR." However, he managed to obtain Soviet citizenship and travel to Italy, from where he returned to the Soviet Union on 4 July 1941, with the staff of the Soviet embassy in Rome.

From August 1941, Staimer received specialized military training near Moscow before being sent to the Comintern school in Kushnarenkovo. There, at the end of 1941, he was recalled for "violating the rules of secrecy and personal weaknesses." He survived the subsequent party investigation without disciplinary action. As a probationary measure, Staimer had to take a job in a construction company in Ufa until, by decision of the KPD leadership, he was reinstated to party work in May 1943. He then briefly served as an instructor at POW camp for officers No. 97 in Yelabuga. However, he was recalled by the NKVD later that same year and transferred back to Ufa. After a preparatory political course near Moscow, Staimer returned to Germany in July 1945.

=== Career in East Germany ===
Staimer initially became head of the Berlin-Prenzlauer Berg Police Inspectorate, joining the Socialist Unity Party of Germany (SED) upon its foundation the following year. He became head of the Brandenburg State Police Authority in Potsdam in April 1946, and from 1 November 1950 held the rank of Chief Inspector.

On 7 November 1947, he married Eleonore Pieck, the daughter of SED Chairman Wilhelm Pieck. They likely met during stays in Ufa or Kuschnarenkowo; the overlap in their biographies suggests this. The marriage lasted until 1954.

In 1950 and 1951, Staimer was sent to a special military training course in Privolzhsk. Afterwards, until 1952, he commanded the Volkspolizei reserve unit in Leipzig with the rank of Inspector General. Staimer then temporarily resigned from the armed forces and from 1952 to 1954 served as Deputy Director General of the Deutsche Reichsbahn, responsible for personnel management. In addition, he was appointed Deputy Minister of Transport in May 1954. From 4 January 1955 until 27 February 1963, Staimer was Chairman of the Central Committee of the Gesellschaft für Sport und Technik ("Sport and Technology Association," GST). Also in 1955, he became a member of the Central Committee of the Free German Youth (FDJ) and a member of the National Council of the National Front, serving in the latter position until 1965. On 15 February 1960, Staimer was promoted to Generalmajor of the National People's Army Reserve. He was reactivated on 1 April 1963, and appointed head of the Military Training Department at the State Secretariat or Ministry of Higher and Technical Education in 1966. On 1 October 1969, Staimer was transferred to the reserves and retired.

Staimer died in East Berlin on 24 October 1982. His urn was interred in the "Pergolenweg" section of the Zentralfriedhof Friedrichsfelde in Berlin.

== Honors ==
On 6 May 1955, Staimer was awarded the Patriotic Order of Merit in Silver. In 1967, he received the Order in Gold, and in 1982 the Order's Gold Clasp. He received the Order of Karl Marx in 1977.

On 7 October 1988, the Kampfschwimmerkommando 18 ("Combat Swimmer Command 18") was awarded the honorary name "Richard Staimer."

== Sources ==
- Klaus Froh, Rüdiger Wenzke: Die Generale und Admirale der NVA. Ein biographisches Handbuch, 4. Auflage. Ch. Links, Berlin 2000, ISBN 3-86153-209-3.
- Hermann Weber, Andreas Herbst: Deutsche Kommunisten. Biographisches Handbuch 1918 bis 1945. 2., überarbeitete und stark erweiterte Auflage. Dietz, Berlin 2008, ISBN 978-3-320-02130-6.
