= Frieda Rosenthal =

German politician (1891–1936)

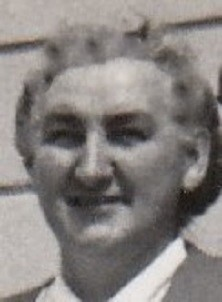
Frieda Rosenthal 1936

Frieda Rosenthal (born Frieda Schrinner: 9 June 1891 – 15 October 1936) was a Berlin local politician and, after 1933, active in resisting the Nazi régime. Concerned that, under interrogation, she had inadvertently implicated a fellow activist, she died by hanging herself, using a radiator, in her prison cell.

== Life ==
Frieda Schrinner was born into a working-class family. At the time of her birth her father was working on the manufacture of horse-trams. She grew up in an artisanal quarter of south-east Berlin, in what is today the Friedrichshain-Kreuzberg district. She attended school locally and then trained for work in the garments industry. Relatively little is known of her early years, but she continued to work in a garment factory till 1919, by which time she had in 1916 married and had a child with Richard Rosenthal, a clerical worker from whom she was later divorced.

After the war she worked as an (at this stage unqualified) nurse-carer, taking a job locally in Berlin's Lichtenberg quarter. It was an unconventional career decision at a time when nursing was seen as a middle-class preserve. Only in 1930 would she finally complete the exams necessary to become a qualified nurse.

In 1919 Frieda Rosenthal joined the Independent Social Democratic Party ("Unabhängige Sozialdemokratische Partei Deutschlands" / USPD). The USPD had emerged a couple of years earlier in the context of a split of the mainstream Social Democratic Party, following ever more acute tensions arising, primarily, over the party leadership decision back in 1914 to implement what amounted to a parliamentary truce over funding for the war. In 1920 she was elected to the party's Lichtenberg district committee ("Bezirksversammlung"). As the USPD itself split apart, later in 1920 Rosenthal was part of the left wing majority that now joined the newly formed Communist Party ("Kommunistische Partei Deutschlands" / KPD). She appears never to have abandoned her nursing completely, employed by the welfare department in Berlin-Lichtenberg and from the mid 1920s working in Berlin's main health counselling office. Any more detailed official records concerning her employment during this period were destroyed in the Second World War. In any case, during the 1920s political work became the priority. In 1924 she was elected a member of the party leadership team ("Bezirksleitung") for Berlin-Brandenburg. Her specific responsibilities lay on the areas of agitation and propaganda (in the portmanteau word of the time, "Agitprop") and, later, women's training and education. The same year she was elected to the Berlin city council ("Stadtverordnetenversammlung"), representing "Electoral District 14" (Berlin-Lichtenberg). During the next few years her party affiliations changed, but she continued to be elected to the Berlin city council without interruption until 1933.

During her time in the city council she could be outspoken. She was involved in an advertisement that insulted President Hindenburg, still widely revered by many as one of the most successful military leaders during the First World War. Citing his wartime exploits she identified him as a mass murderer. Her outspokenness resonated with the party leadership, especially after 1924 when the left-wing took control. In 1927 she was on the receiving end of a court action issued on behalf of the president. She defended her position in the following terms: "It was unthinkable for me to meet the individual who is the current state president. In my position as a local representative I believe I am entitled to voice criticism in respect of the pre-revolutionary period. I simply wanted to make an observation concerning another time." Nevertheless, despite being happy to "name the guilty men" her greater concern was with the clouds of social deprivation which had never really lifted in the years of acute economic hardship that had followed the war, and in that sense her practical approach was never entirely aligned with the more theoretical and doctrinaire concerns that underpinned the party leadership. During the internal party ructions that followed the death of Lenin, she backed the opposition line of the ultra-left at the time of the so-called "Open letter" in September 1925, but by November 1925 had already swung behind the party majority.

One issue that attracted her passionate intervention involved the fierce discussions which took place in the city council during 1926 over the financing of the "Berliner Jugendland" children's holiday home which had opened the previous year. Using previously military buildings, the institution provided six week long holidays for Berlin children who had lost their fathers in the war. As an advocate for "hands-on" communist policies, Rosenthal demanded proper funding for the establishment, and mocked suggestions that fatherless children should be sent instead to the countryside for their summer holidays in order that they could be used as cheap labour on the farms and great landed estates of East Prussia: "[whereas] if we have the possibility to send thousands of Berlins school children for a few weeks during the summer to be accommodated with their class-mates, that is a [real] step forwards ... ".

In 1929, representing the Communist Party, she took a full-time job as a councillor in central Berlin. However, the party conflicts and accompanying purges in Moscow, reflecting Stalin's conviction - not entirely incorrect - that he might be surrounded by political rivals, found powerful echoes in the German sister party. In February 1930 Frieda Rosenthal was one of the signatories of the "Letter of the 60", organised by Erich Raddatz (and others). The letter criticised the direction being taken by the Soviet party leadership under Stalin. However, the party leaderships in the two countries were at this time closely aligned, and after signing the declaration Rosenthal was excluded from the party by the leadership in Berlin. Directly following this she is listed, among the members of the city council, as being "partyless". Along with others similarly excluded ex-communists, she belonged for some months to the so-called "Group 60". In or before 1931 she joined the Social Democratic Party ("Sozialdemokratische Partei Deutschlands" / SPD). During her final months as a member of the Communist Party she had switched from representing the Lichtenberg electoral district (District 14) in the city council to representing the Kreuzberg electoral district (District 6), and it was the Kreuzberg district that she continued to represent, as an SPD party member, till 1933.

The political class was not blind to the threat of post-democratic populism represented by the Nazi Party, and as early as 1930 the SPD attempted to block a Nazi take-over by entering into some degree of political truce with the democratic parties of the political centre both in the national parliament (Reichstag) and regionally, in the Prussian Landtag and in the Berlin city council. The strategy was not a great success, and it appalled many on the left wing of the SPD who responded by setting up a break-away Socialist Workers' Party ("Sozialistische Arbeiterpartei Deutschlands" / SAP), hoping to forge a strategic political alliance not with the political centre but with the Communists. A particularly high-profile (at least in retrospect) deserter to the SAP was Willy Brandt. Frieda Rosenthal had also switched to the SAP by the end of 1932 according to at least one source, although other sources imply that her move may have come a couple of months later.

In any event, the SAP met with little electoral success. The change of government in January 1933 indicated that attempts to thwart the populists had failed. The new government lost no time in transforming the country into a one-party dictatorship. The Reichstag fire in February 1933 was instantly (and apparently ahead of any investigation) blamed on "Communists", and those identified as having any sort of political past involving communism found themselves at the top of the government's target list. However, all political parties (apart from the Nazi party) had been outlawed by the end of June 1933. Frieda Rosenthal lost her job as a nurse and, after a brief period of unemployment, returned to work in the garment industry. Earlier political differences between comrades were forgotten and she joined an underground communist resistance group in Berlin's Friedrichshain quarter. The known illegal political activity in which they engaged included procuring information and distributing leaflets. Identified by the cover name Käthe, Frieda Rosenthal was in charge of "information" for the local group. In the immediate term, however, she remained at liberty and was able to continue working.

By the summer of 1936 many local resistance groups, including the one in Friedrichshain, had been thoroughly penetrated by the intelligence services. Frieda Rosenthal was arrested on 19 August 1936 on suspicion of "preparing high treason" ("Vorbereitung zum Hochverrat") which was the usual charge under these circumstances. She was immediately taken to the detention centre in Berlin-Moabit and placed in rigidly enforced solitary confinement, unable to communicate with the outside world even in writing. She was subjected to repetitive and brutal interrogation, but refused to disclose the names of any of the comrades with whom she had been involved in her resistance work. There came a time, however, when she thought she had inadvertently identified one of them during an interrogation session. She was able to write immediately to the investigating judge with responsibility for the case that she believed she had falsely identified someone as a result of her own failing memory, but she became concerned that this "written recantation" would be ignored or overlooked. The situation led her to take her own life later on the same day. She hanged herself on 15 October 1936 using the radiator in her cell.

== Celebration ==
Among the more recent celebrations of the life of Frieda Rosenthal is a Stolperstein, set into the road space outside her former home at Fanninger Street 53 ("Fanningerstraße 53") in the on 1 October 2008. This resulted from an initiative by the Berlin politician, Birgit Monteiro.

Since 2010 a street in a new residential development in Berlin-Karlshorst has carried her name.

Inaugurated in 2009 the Frieda Rosenthal prize is awarded annually to recognise and honour people from Berlin-Lichtenberg who have made an outstanding contribution, notably in the social and welfare spheres. Any resident of Lichtenberg can nominate a potential recipient.
