= Wilhelm Pieck =

President of East Germany from 1949 to 1960

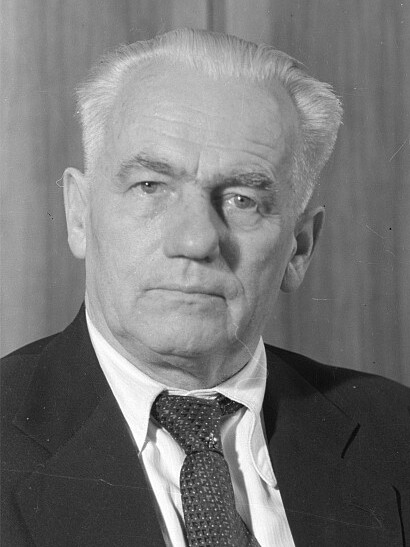
- Pieck in 1946

President of the German Democratic Republic
- In office 11 October 1949 – 7 September 1960
- Chancellor: Otto Grotewohl
- Preceded by: Johannes Dieckmann (acting)
- Succeeded by: Johannes Dieckmann (acting)

Chairman of the Socialist Unity Party
- In office 22 April 1946 – 25 July 1950 Serving with Otto Grotewohl
- Deputy: Walter Ulbricht; Max Fechner
- Preceded by: Himself (as Chairman of the KPD)
- Succeeded by: Walter Ulbricht (as General Secretary)

Chairman of the Communist Party of Germany
- In office (Note: Ernst Thälmann, who had been arrested by the Gestapo on 3 March 1933, remained de jure party leader until his execution on 18 August 1944; Schehr and later Pieck were acting chairmen as deputy leaders.); 1 February 1934 – 22 April 1946
- Preceded by: John Schehr
- Succeeded by: East: Himself (as Co-Chairman of the Socialist Unity Party); West: Max Reimann (1948)
Parliamentary constituencies
Member of the Provisional Volkskammer
In office 7 October 1949 – 22 February 1950
Preceded by	Constituency established
Succeeded by	Willi Stoph
Member of the Reichstag for Berlin
In office 1 July 1928 – 28 February 1933
Preceded by	Multi-member district
Succeeded by	Constituency abolished
Member of the Landtag of Prussia for Potsdam II
In office 25 May 1932 – 31 March 1933
Preceded by	Multi-member district
Succeeded by	Constituency abolished
In office September 1921 – 14 June 1928
Preceded by	Adolph Hoffmann
Succeeded by	Erich Raddatz

Personal details
- Born: Friedrich Wilhelm Reinhold Pieck; 3 January 1876 Guben, Province of Brandenburg, Kingdom of Prussia, German Empire (now Gubin, Poland)
- Died: 7 September 1960 (aged 84) East Berlin, East Germany
- Resting place: Zentralfriedhof Friedrichsfelde
- Party: SPD (1895–1917); USPD (1917–1919); KPD (1919–1946); SED (1946–1960)
- Other political affiliations: Spartacus League (1914–1918)
- Spouse: Christine Häfker (m. 1898; died 1936)
- Children: Elly; Arthur; Eleonore
- Relatives: Theodor Winter (son-in-law); Richard Staimer (son-in-law)
- Occupation: Carpenter; Party Functionary; Politician

Military service
- Allegiance: German Empire
- Branch/service: Imperial German Army
- Years of service: 1915–1918
- Battles/wars: World War I; Western Front; Battle of Verdun; Eastern Front
- Central institution membership: 1949–1960: Full member, Politburo of the Central Committee; 1946–1960: Full member, Central Committee (Note: Party Executive Committee until 1950); 1920–1922; 1926–1937: Full member, KPD Politburo; 1919–1946: Full member, KPD Central Committee (Note: Zentrale until 1925); Other offices held: 1946–1949: Member, Landtag of Brandenburg; 1930–1932: Member, Prussian State Council; 1929–1933: Member, Berlin City Council; 1926–1929: Political Leader, Berlin-Brandenberg KPD; 1924–1925: Chairman, Rote Hilfe Deutschlands; 1906–1910: Member, Bürgerschaft of Bremen

Friedrich Wilhelm Reinhold Pieck (German pronunciation: [ˈvɪlhɛlm ˈpiːk]; 3 January 1876 – 7 September 1960) was a German communist politician who served as the co-chairman of the Socialist Unity Party from 1946 to 1950 and as the only president of the German Democratic Republic (East Germany) from 1949 until his death in 1960.

Pieck had been active in the SPD since the 1890s, breaking from the party in 1917 over his opposition to the First World War. He co-founded the Spartacus League and the KPD, rising to become chairman of the latter organization following the imprisonment of Ernst Thälmann and John Schehr by the Nazis. After the end of the Second World War, he played a key role in the 1946 merger of the KPD and SPD into the Socialist Unity Party of Germany, which served as the ruling party of East Germany from 1949 until 1989.

== Early life ==
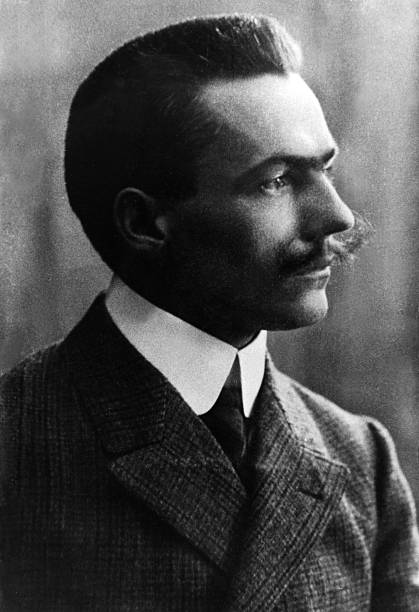
Pieck as a young party activist, 1907

Pieck was born into a Catholic family, as the son of the coachman Friedrich Pieck and his wife Auguste in the eastern part of Guben, in what was then the German Empire and is now Gubin, Poland. Two years later, his mother died. The father soon married the washerwoman Wilhelmine Bahro. After attending elementary school, the young Wilhelm completed a four-year carpentry apprenticeship. As a journeyman, he joined the German Timber Workers Association in 1894.

As a carpenter, in 1894 Pieck joined the wood-workers' federation, which steered him towards joining the Social Democratic Party of Germany (SPD) the following year. Pieck became the chairman of the party urban district in 1899, and in 1906 became full-time secretary of the SPD. The same year, he was elected to the Bürgerschaft of Bremen. In 1914, he moved to a three-room apartment in Berlin-Steglitz. By now he had his own study with many shelves full of books. In May 1915, he was arrested at a major women's demonstration in front of the Reichstag and kept in "protective custody" until October. As Bremen Party secretary in 1916, Pieck had asked Anton Pannekoek to continue teaching socialist theory in the party school.

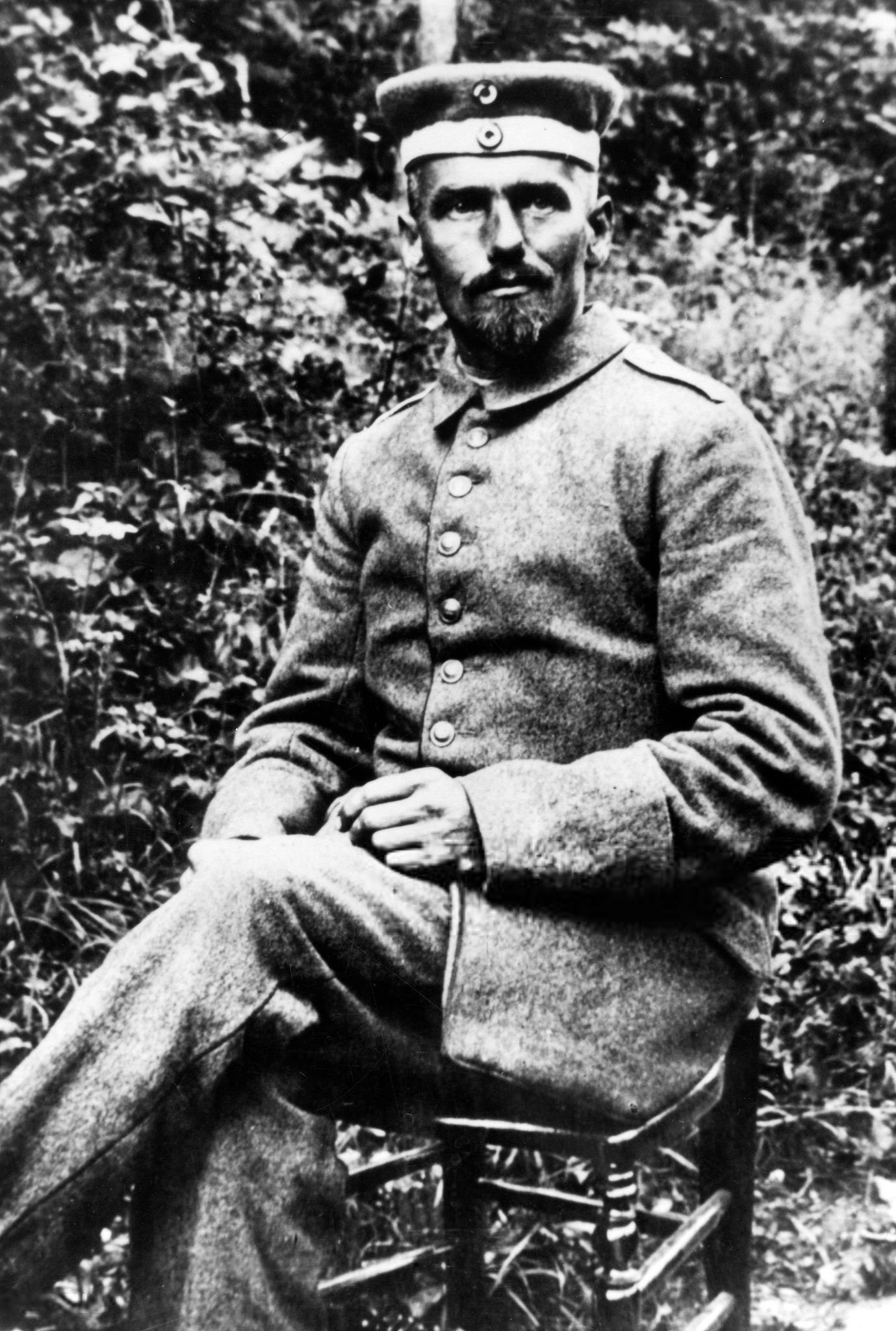
Pieck as a soldier on the Western Front in World War I, July 1917

Although the majority of the SPD supported the German government in World War I, Pieck was a member of the party's left wing, which opposed the war. After being released from protective custody he was conscripted into the German Army, serving on the Eastern (at the Neisse River) and Western Fronts (at the Battle of Verdun). His open opposition to the war led to his arrest and detention in a military prison. After being released, Pieck deserted and briefly lived in exile in Amsterdam. Upon his return to Berlin in 1918, Pieck joined the newly founded Communist Party of Germany (KPD).

== Weimar era ==
On 16 January 1919 Pieck, along with Rosa Luxemburg and Karl Liebknecht, was arrested in Berlin's Wilmersdorf district and taken to the Eden Hotel. Liebknecht and Luxemburg were then killed while "being taken to prison" by a unit of Freikorps. While the two were being murdered, Pieck claimed that he managed to escape. Due to lingering suspicions about Pieck's reported escape, KPD chairman Ernst Thälmann called Pieck before a party court chaired by Hans Kippenberger in 1929. The party court's decision was never published and Kippenberger was executed in Moscow after a secret trial in 1937. According to Waldemar Pabst (the officer who gave the order to kill Liebknecht and Luxemburg), Pieck did not actually escape, but was released in return for providing details about the military plans and hiding places of other KPD members.

During the Ruhr uprising, Pieck was sent by the KPD as a political advisor to the Ruhr Red Army. He was a founding member of the International Red Aid in 1922, serving first on its executive committee then as chairman from 1937 to 1941. In 1924 he became the first chairman of the Rote Hilfe, serving until Clara Zetkin succeeded him the next year. From February 1926 to November 1929 he served as political leader of the KPD's Berlin-Brandenberg district, but was removed from office and replaced by Walter Ulbricht for not supporting Ernst Thälmann during the Wittorf Affair.

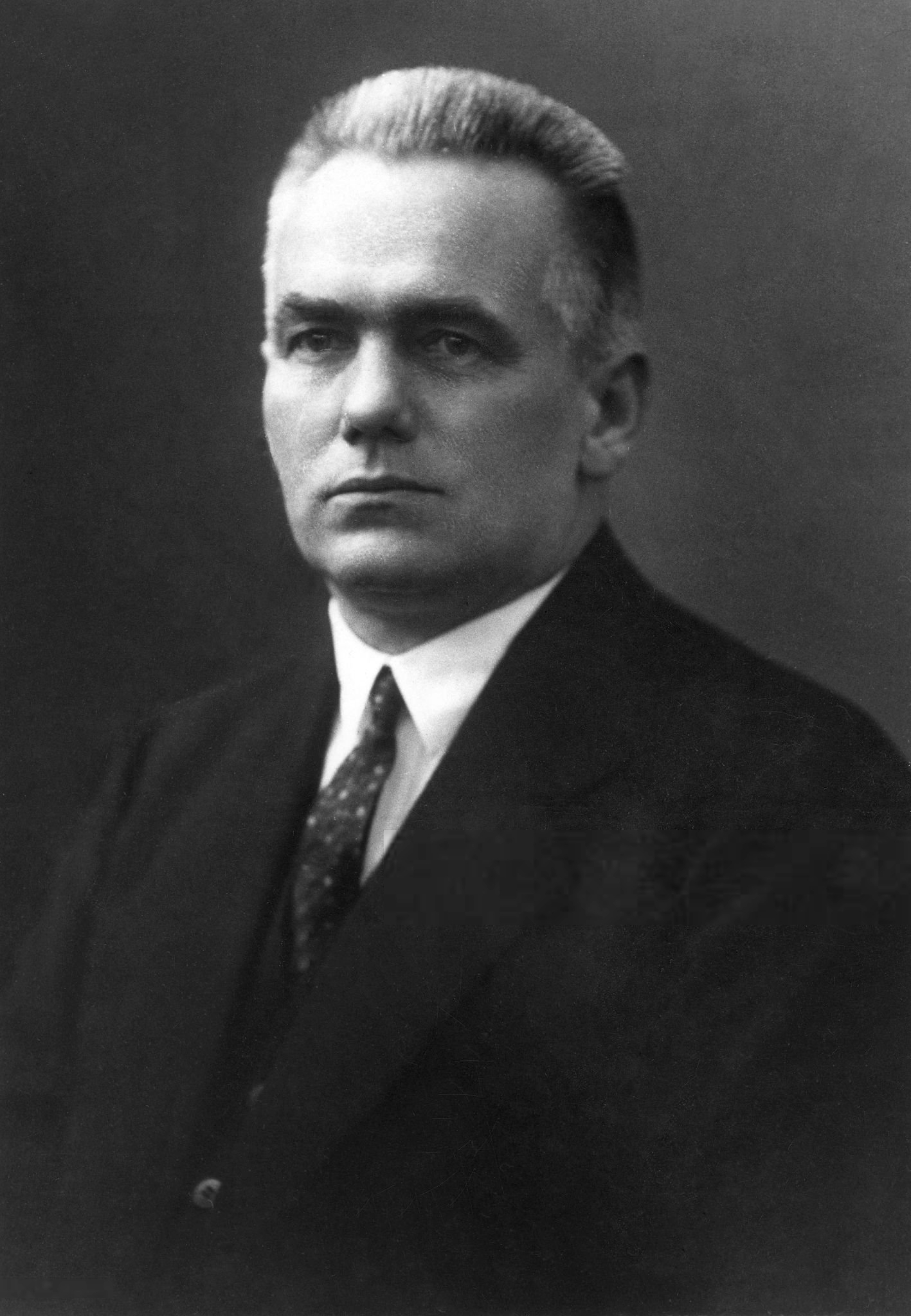
Pieck's official Reichstag portrait, 1928

Pieck held several elected offices in the Weimar Republic. He served in the Landtag of Prussia from 1921 to 1928 and again from 1932 to 1933 (leading the party in that body), the Reichstag from 1928 to 1933, the Berlin City Council from 1929 to 1933, and the Prussian State Council from 1930 to 1932.

== Nazi years and Moscow exile ==
On 4 March 1933, one day before the Reichstag election, Pieck's family left their Steglitz apartment and moved into a cook's room. His son and younger daughter had been in the Soviet Union since 1932 while his eldest daughter Elly was still in Germany. At the beginning of May 1933, he left first to Paris and then to Moscow. In Moscow, Pieck served the Communist Party in a variety of capacities. From 1935 until 1943, he held the position of Secretary of the Communist International. In 1943 Pieck was among the founders of the National Committee for a Free Germany, an anti-Nazi organisation created by the Soviets aimed at Germans.

On 22 June 1941, Pieck and his family were in their country house on the outskirts of Moscow. Pieck came downstairs at six o'clock to his children's bedroom and said: "Children, get up, it was announced on the radio that war is over. Hitler invaded the Soviet Union, but that will be the end". In March 1942, the family was able to return home after the Soviet Armed Forces won the Battle of Moscow.

== Soviet occupation zone ==
At the conclusion of the war in 1945 Pieck returned to Germany with the victorious Red Army. A year later, he helped engineer the merger of the eastern branches of the KPD and SPD into the Socialist Unity Party (SED). He was elected as the merged party's co-chairman, alongside former SPD leader Otto Grotewohl. His hand appeared alongside Grotewohl's on the SED's "handshake" logo, derived from the SPD-KPD congress establishing the party where he symbolically shook hands with Grotewohl.

== President of East Germany ==
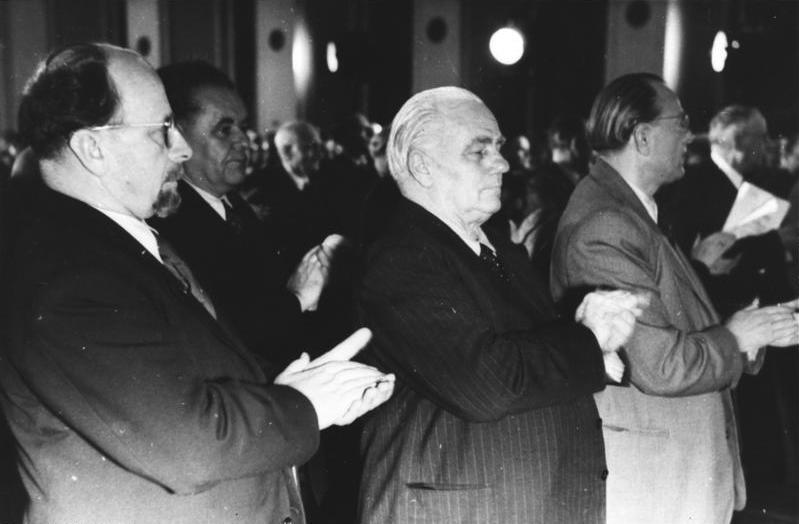
Walter Ulbricht, Wilhelm Pieck and Otto Grotewohl at the founding ceremony of the German Democratic Republic, 1949

In October 1949, on the territory of the Soviet occupation zone the German Democratic Republic, or East Germany, was formally established. Pieck was elected president of the new country. He served as East Germany's first (and last) president until his death in 1960.

Nominally, for the GDR's first year, Pieck was the number-two man in the government behind Grotewohl, who became the new country's first prime minister. In the East German political hierarchy, the prime minister was the top state official, while the president nominally ranked second.

He lost the co-chairmanship of the ruling SED (which he held with Grotewohl) in 1950, when Walter Ulbricht became the party's General Secretary as the party restructured along more orthodox Soviet lines. Nonetheless, he retained his other posts, including the presidency, due to Joseph Stalin's trust in him.

== Last years ==
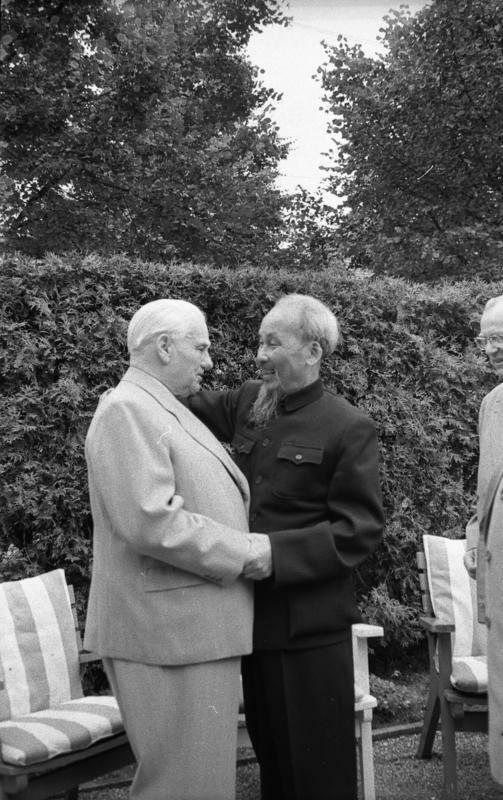
Pieck meeting with North Vietnamese leader Ho Chi Minh, 1959

Pieck was already 73 years old at the time of his initial election as president. He nominally held the second highest state post in the GDR (behind Prime Minister Grotewohl) and served as SED co-chairman for the first four years of the party's existence. He was also a member of the SED's Politburo, the highest authority in the party. Despite this, he played a mostly minor role in the party, particularly after 1950.

On 13 July 1953, he suffered a second stroke. He also had progressive liver cirrhosis and existing ascites. A detailed medical report composed before the second stroke mentioned "mild paralysis on the right, a slight drooping of the corner of the mouth, breathing wheezing or snoring, slowed down pulse, tone of the limb musculature lowered ...".

In August 1960 he moved to a new summer residence, the converted former mansion of the Hermann Göring Leibförsters near "Carinhall".

In March 1956, due to health reasons Pieck was hardly able to fulfill all obligations as Head of State. He attended only a few events such as the Central Committee meeting in January 1957 and the opening of the 5th Party Congress of the SED in July 1958. The last months of his life spent Pieck in his country house in the Schorfheide, where he received the leadership of foreign delegations to the 10th anniversary of the GDR in October 1959.

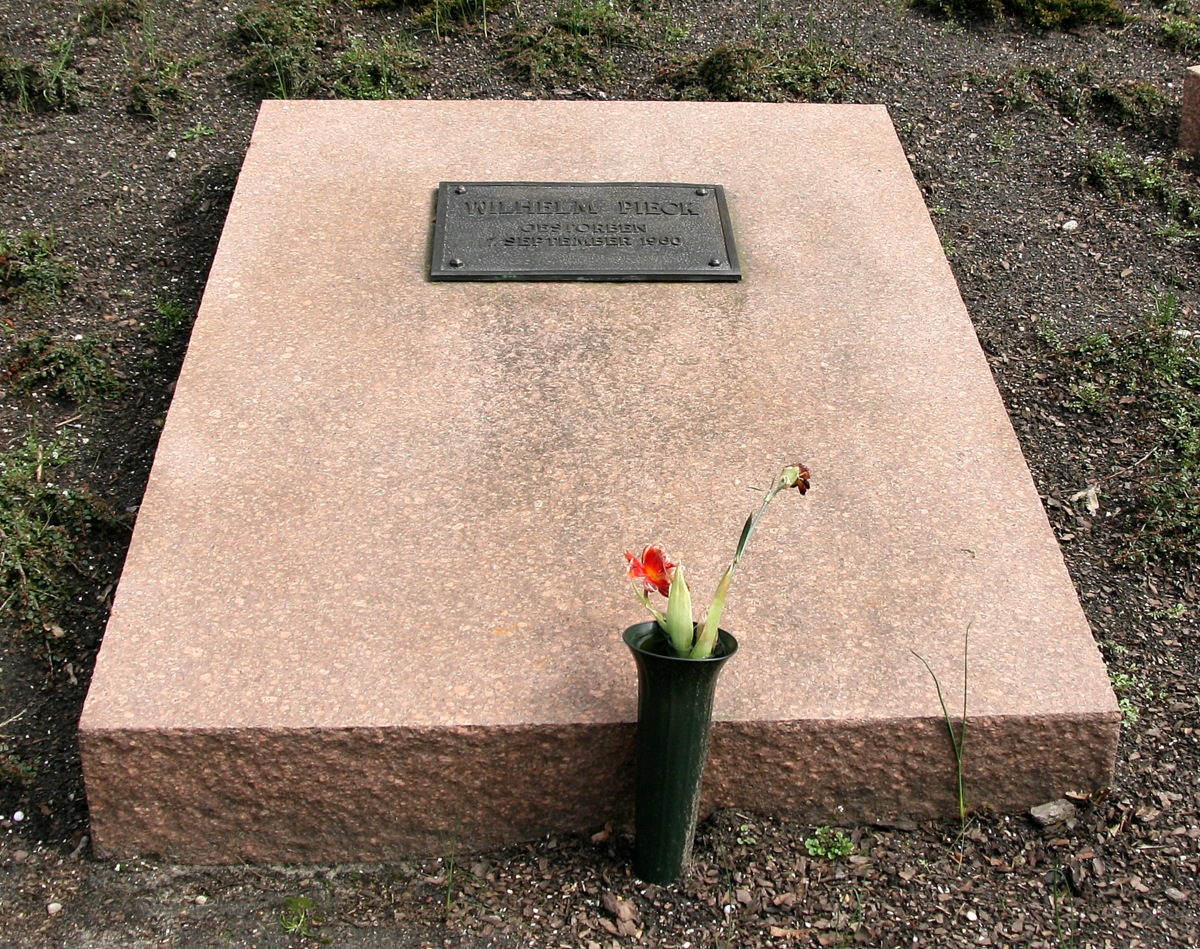
Pieck's tomb at the Memorial to the Socialists in the Friedrichsfelde Central Cemetery

Pieck died at Majakowskiring 29, Pankow, East Berlin. He was honoured with a state funeral, cremated and buried at the Memorial to the Socialists (German: Gedenkstätte der Sozialisten) in the Friedrichsfelde Central Cemetery, Berlin.

== Personal life ==
He was married to Christine Häfker, a garments worker whom he met in a large dance hall in Bremen. At first, her parents did not want her to go out with a "red", but once she was pregnant, she was allowed to marry Wilhelm on 28 May 1898, on the condition that a traditional wedding in a church would still take place. On the wedding day Christine waited impatiently for Pieck to arrive at the church. At the last minute, he finally did, still carrying communist leaflets. In November 1936, his wife contracted pneumonia for the third time, dying on 1 December of the same year.

The Piecks' daughter, Elly Winter (1898–1987), held various posts in the SED and East German government. Their son Arthur Pieck (1899–1970) served as head of the East German national airline Interflug from 1955 to 1965, after having held various administrative posts in East Germany, for instance at the German Economic Commission. The youngest child, Eleonore Staimer (1906–1998), worked as a party official and, for a time, as a diplomat.

== Honours and awards ==
=== National honours ===
- Hero of Labour (1951)
- Order of Karl Marx (1953)
- Patriotic Order of Merit in Gold (1954)
- Banner of Labour (1960)

=== Foreign honours ===
- (Czechoslovakia) Grand Cross of the Order of the White Lion (1956)

== Photo gallery ==
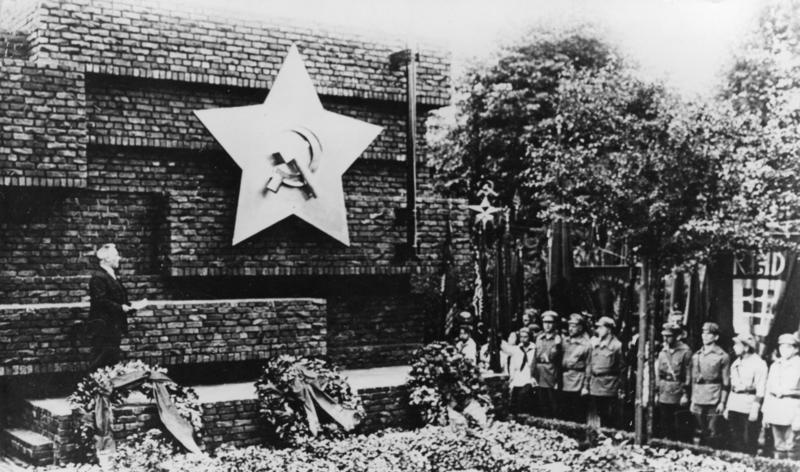
Pieck in June 1926, dedicating the memorial statue for the victims of the German November Revolution of 1918

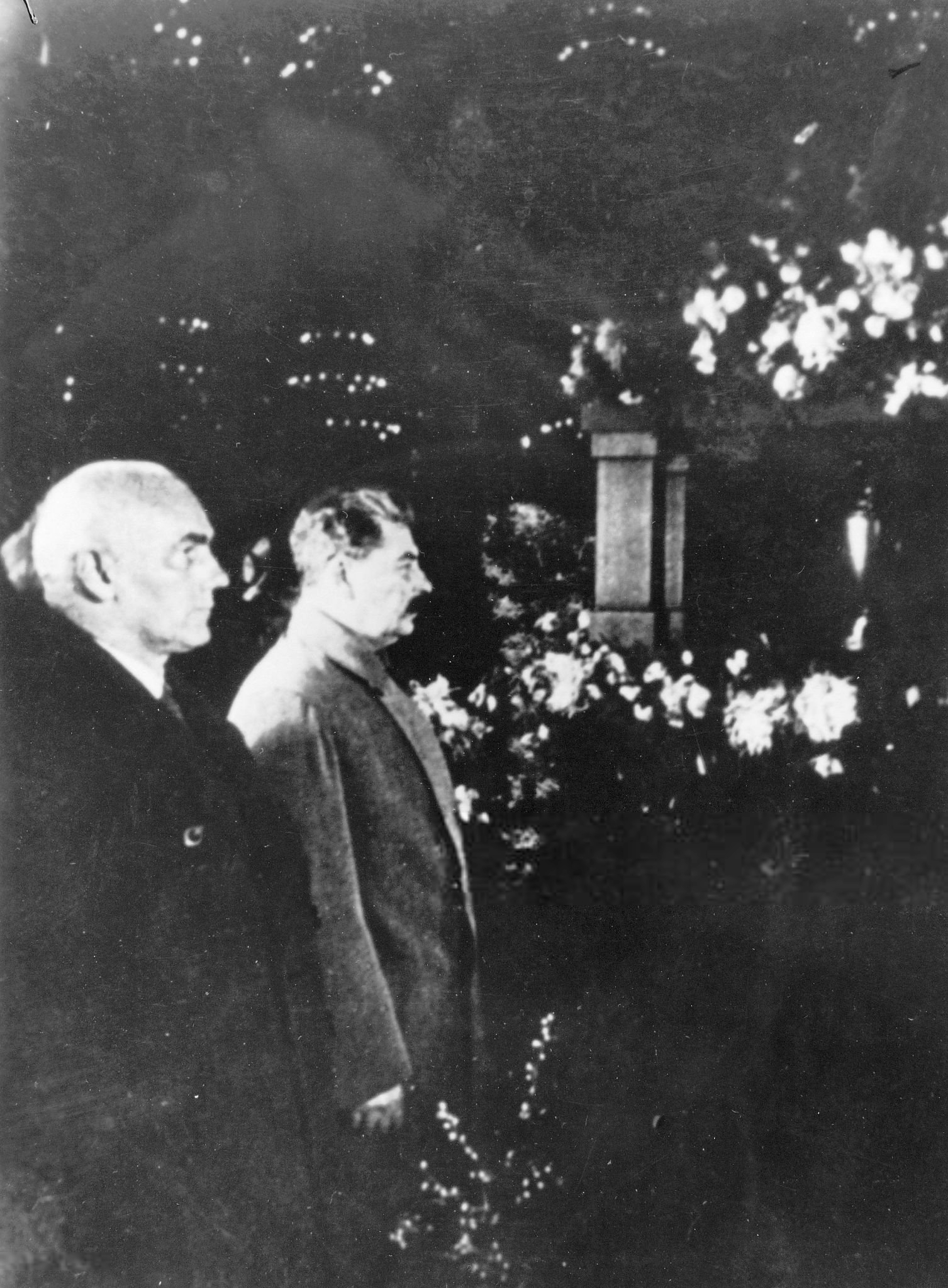
Pieck (left) standing guard with Joseph Stalin (right) at the urn of Sen Katayama, November 1933

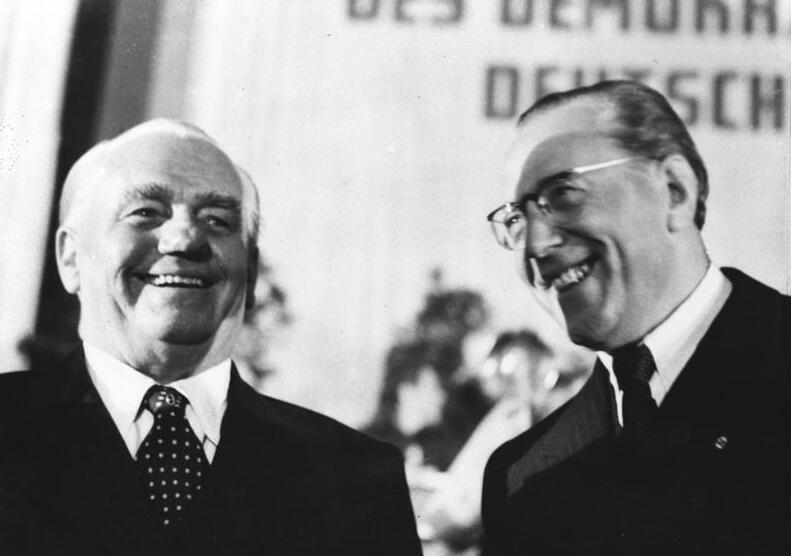
Pieck (left) and Otto Grotewohl in 1949

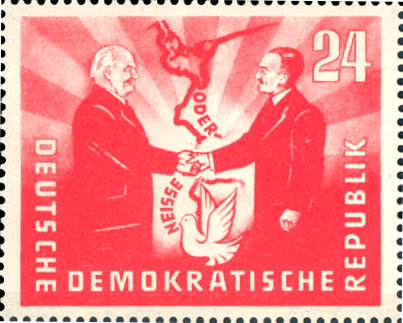
1951 East German commemorative stamp of the Treaty of Zgorzelec establishing the Oder-Neisse line as a “border of peace”, with Pieck and President Bolesław Bierut of Poland

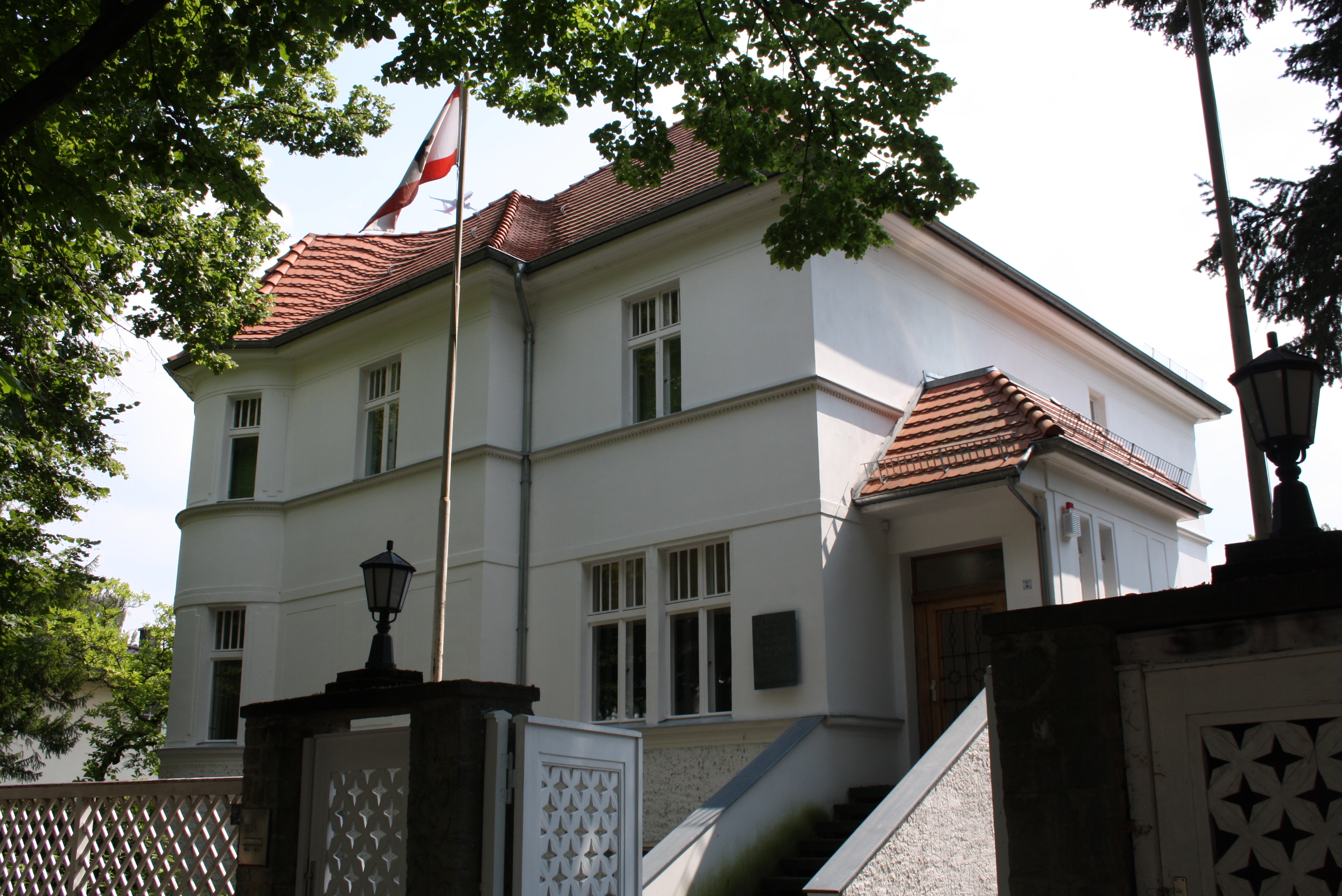
House of Wilhelm Pieck in Majakowskiring 29, Berlin

== Notes ==
Party political offices
New office	Chairman of the Socialist Unity Party of Germany; 1946–1950; Served alongside: Otto Grotewohl	Succeeded by Walter Ulbricht as First Secretary
Political offices
Preceded by Karl Dönitz as President of the German Reich	President of the German Democratic Republic; 1949–1960	Succeeded by Walter Ulbricht as Chair of the Council of State
