= Arthur Pieck =

East German politician (1899-1970)

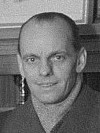
- Pieck in 1946
- Born: Arthur Heinrich Walter Pieck; 28 December 1899; Bremen, Germany
- Died: 13 January 1970 (aged 70); Biesdorf (Berlin), East Germany
- Occupations: Typesetter; Political activist Agitprop leader Agitprop stage show organiser Airline director
- Spouse: Margarete Lode (m. 1945; died 1952)
- Parents: Wilhelm Pieck (father); Christine Häfker (mother)
- Relatives: Elly Winter (sister); Eleonore Staimer (sister)

Arthur Pieck (28 December 1899 – 13 January 1970) was a German politician, typesetter and translator. He was a committed political activist who became a stage and movie actor and, later, a Communist party official. He topped off his varied career, between 1955 and 1960, as a senior director - ultimately General Director - of Interflug, the East German national airline. After this he served, between 1960 and 1965, as a junior Transport Minister.

Arthur Pieck's father, Wilhelm Pieck, served as the President of East Germany between 1949 and 1960.

== Life ==
=== Family provenance and early years ===
Arthur Heinrich Walter Pieck, the second of his parents' three recorded child, was born in Bremen where his father worked as a qualified carpenter and was active in local politics (SPD). Arthur Pieck's parents had married early the previous year: his mother, born Christine Häfker, worked in the garment industry. His father was an active left wing member of the SPD and a consummate networker, as a result of which Arthur, while still a boy, could come into contact with stars of the contemporary socialist movement without leaving the family home. Visitors included Rosa Luxemburg along with Käte and Hermann Duncker and Franz Mehring. He attended secondary school in Bremen and then, after the family relocated, in Berlin. Between April 1914 and January 1918 he trained for work as a typesetter.

=== War years ===
From an early age Arthur Pieck was also active politically. He was a leader in the Young Socialists in the Steglitz quarter of Berlin in 1914 and then for Greater Berlin from 1915. He joined the antiwar Spartacus League in 1916 which was the year in which he also joined the Independent Social Democratic Party ("Unabhängige Sozialdemokratische Partei Deutschlands" / USPD), a breakaway party formed by SPD members who found the SPD's parliamentary acquiescence in respect of war funding unacceptable. In 1917 he found himself arrested and indicted for "high treason" (... wegen "Hoch- und Landesverrats"). At the end of December 1917 he celebrated his eighteenth birthday by refusing to report for "military service": between February and November 1918 he lived in the Netherlands where the government had managed to avoid direct involvement in the fighting of the First World War An early appetite for journalism was apparent from his production of "Der Kampf" ("The Struggle"), a news sheet for German army deserters who had taken refuge in the Netherlands.

=== Post war political activism ===
War ended in November 1918 and Pieck immediately crossed the border back into Germany where political, social and economic chaos prevailed. He became a print worker for the Spartacus League. When the USPD, in turn, broke apart, Pieck was one of those participating in the Berlin meeting which took place between 30 December 1918 and 1 January 1919 which came to be celebrated as the founding conference of the Communist Party of Germany. January 1919 found him working as a type setter in the printing works of the newspaper "Vorwärts". He also became involved in the revolutionary uprising in Berlin. During the revolutionary months from February till the Autumn of 1919 he worked as a typesetter in a succession of illegal printing shops operated by or on behalf of the Communist Party, also serving as a courier for the party leadership. Between January and March 1920 he was detained in Berlin's Moabit Jail.

In March 1920 Pieck took on leadership of the party news and information service in Berlin-Steglitz. At the same time he became the local leader for the party's Steglitz district. Between April 1920 and October 1921 he was employed in the party's publishing business. Between 1921 and 1925 he was a member of the Berlin leadership team for the party's news service. He was also employed, between October 1921 and October 1932 by the permanent (and always lavishly staffed) Soviet Trade Mission in Berlin, working first in the transport department and later in the agriculture department.

In 1922 he became head of the Workers' Hiking Movement ("Arbeiterwanderbewegung"), initially in Berlin-Steglitz and later for the whole of Berlin. Organised hiking was, at the time, a more consciously politicised activity in Germany than in the United Kingdom or the United States. At the end of 1922 Pieck was a co-founder of the "Proletarian Lecture and Games Community, Steglitz" ("Proletar. Sprech- u. Spielgem. Steglitz"). In 1923 he became a member of the national leadership of the Friends of Natureworkers' hiking association, and in 1924 he took on leadership of the Berlin "Sprechchor" performing group.

In June 1924 Pieck joined the German National Workers' Theatre Group ("Arbeiter-Theater-Bund Deutschlands" / ATBD) and in 1925/27 he became head of the "Red Shirts" Berlin Agitprop performance group. In 1927 he also took over leadership of the ATBD for Berlin, becoming Senior Chairman of the group nationally between 1928 and 1932. In 1929 he co-founded the International Workers Theatre Association ("Internat. Arbeitertheater-Bund" / IATB ), renamed IRTB in 1932 in order to include the adjective "revolutionary" in the title. He was a member of the presidium of this association till 1938 and head of its West European section (based, at least notionally in Berlin) from 1932.

=== Nazi years ===
It seems likely that the IRTB and some or all of these organisations were inspired and possibly financially backed by Moscow. Between 1932 and 1938 Pieck was also a permanent member of the IRTB in Moscow. During 1932, as the Nazi surge in Germany became unstoppable, he appears to have relocated from Berlin to Moscow where during 1932 he studied at the International Lenin School. Between December 1932 and February 1933, the months which covered the Nazi power seizure, Pieck was back in Berlin. From 14 February 1933 till 1934 he was director of the Kolonne Links ("Left Column") German Agitprop theatre troupe. The German government had lost no time in transforming Germany into a one-party dictatorship, and especially following the Reichstag fire at the end of February 1933, had pursued activist members of the (now illegal) Communist Party of Germany with particular savagery. It is therefore not surprising that sources are unclear over how much time Pieck and other members of the Kolonne Links group spent in Germany and how much time they spent as members of the growing population of German political exiles in Moscow, during 1933 and the years that followed. During May/June 1933 Arthur Pieck headed up the organising committee for the First International Olympiade at the Moscow Review Theatre. From 1934 he worked as an editor with the "News sheet for Theatre, Music, Film and Dance" ("Zeitschrift für Theater, Musik, Film, Tanz") which was the principal publication of the International Revolutionary Theatre Association (IRTB).

Between 1935 and 1938 he undertook a considerable amount of overseas travel on behalf of the IRTB. In 1936 he traveled with Erwin Piscator to Paris. Paris, like Moscow, was becoming an informal headquarters location for the German Communist Party in exile. Their objective in Paris – at least as far as Pieck and party comrades in Moscow were concerned – was to set up and develop a western European branch office of the IRTB. However, the project fizzled out when the Germans learned that Piscator was in danger of falling victim to the dictator's paranoia if he returned to Moscow. Piscator stayed in Paris, emigrating to the United States three years later, while Arthur Pieck appears quietly to have returned to Moscow.

Family

With the important exception of his father, President Wilhelm Pieck, all of Arthur Pieck's more immediate relatives are commemorated on a single grave stone in the honoured "Socialists' Memorial" section of Berlin's Friedrichsfelde Main Cemetery.

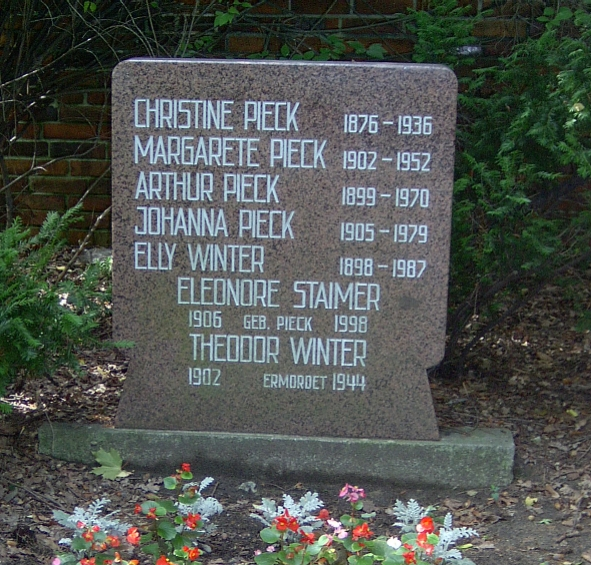

- Christine Pieck (born Christine Häfker: 1876-1936) was his mother
- Margarete Pieck (born Margarete Lode: 1902-1952) was his wife
- Johanna Pieck (1905-1979) was
- Elly Winter (born Elly Pieck: 1898-1987) was his elder sister
- Eleonore Staimer (born Eleonore Pieck: 1906-1998) was his younger sister
- Theodor Winter (1902-1944) was his brother in law

=== Personal setbacks ===
By 1936 the Piecks had made their home in Moscow, and it was in nearby Podlipiki that at the end of August Arthur Pieck's mother, Christine, who was staying with Arthur's elder sister Elly Winter, fell ill with a serious lung disease. She died on 1 December 1936 at the Kremlin Clinic in Moscow. It was only twenty years later, on 29 December 1956, that her ashes were transferred to Germany and interred in the Friedrichsfelde Cemetery. Meanwhile, in another personal blow, the German government removed Arthur Pieck's German citizenship on 24 March 1937, leaving him prima facie stateless.

=== War years ===
Between May 1938 and June 1941 Pieck worked in the Moscow press office of the Comintern. At the start of 1941, as the German government prepared to tear up their non-aggression pact with the Soviet Union and launch an invasion, Arthur Pieck's name was added to the Gestapo's "special USSR list" of people in the Soviet Union to be sought out and dealt with as a priority. Between 8 July 1941 and May 1945 he served as a Senior Policy Commissar ("Oberpolitkommissar") and Captain ("Hauptmann") with the Central Administration ("Hauptverwaltung") of the Red Army. The focus of his work, as previously, was on propaganda, now working on the military frontline and, increasingly, among German prisoners of war in the internment camps. In December 1941 he was teamed up with Walter Ulbricht and the two of them were sent to work at the prisoner of war encampment at Spaskij Zavod near Karaganda in Kazakhstan. In Summer 1942 he was undertaking propaganda work on the Caucasus Front. From the end of November 1942 till January 1943 he was producing the German language newspaper "Neuste Nachrichten" ("Latest News") on the Stalingrad Front, activity for which he was awarded the Order of the Patriotic War medal. During 1943 he organised preparation for the launch of the National Committee for a Free Germany ("Nationalkomitee Freies Deutschland" / NKFD). War ended, formally, in May 1945. By that time Arthur Pieck had returned with the Red army the previous month to what remained of Berlin.

=== Soviet Occupation Zone ===
The victorious nations had already agreed that the western two thirds of Germany should be divided into military occupation zones. A large part of the country surrounding Berlin, including the eastern part of the city itself, was to be administered as the Soviet occupation zone. Pieck's years in the Soviet Union had left him genuinely bilingual, and as he entered Berlin as a Soviet officer in the 5th Shock Army, he was working as a simultaneous translator, assigned to Nikolai Berzarin, who later became city commander of Berlin.

He was formally demobilised on 16 May 1945, less than two weeks after the end of the war. In November 1945 Arthur Pieck married Margarete "Grete" Lode (1902–1952), a friend from his IRTB days as an organiser of Agitprop stage shows whom he had known since 1929 or earlier. A succession of well regarded and lucrative jobs followed. In December 1945 he became a member of the Berlin Magistrat (city administration) and Stadtrat (councillor) for personnel and administration matters ("Stadtrat für Personal und Verwaltung"), one of the most influential departments of the city administration. In April 1946 he was one of the delegates at the "unification party congress" at which, under circumstances that would remain contentious, the Socialist Unity Party ("Sozialistische Einheitspartei Deutschlands" / SED), a new united left wing party, was established to ensure that divisions on the political left should never again open the way for a takeover of the state by right wing nationalists. Ironically, by the time, in October 1949, when the Soviet occupation zone was relaunched as the Soviet sponsored East Germany, the SED would itself have become the apparently permanent ruling party in a new kind of one-party dictatorship. In 1946 Arthur Pieck was formally acknowledged to have been a victim of fascism. Between March and June 1947 he was employed by the Economics Department of the important party Central Executive (forerunner of the party Central Committee). From 16 June 1947 till 15 October 1949 he served as National Department head of Personnel and Administration for the German Economic Commission. A further senior government job in personnel and training followed between 1949 and 1955. Arthur Pieck gained that position on 16 October 1949, just five days after his father was elected the first (and as matters would turn out only) President of the new East Germany.

=== Airline boss ===
With the division of Germany after 1949 looking increasingly permanent, there were practical and legal disputes over which Germany should inherit those German brand names from before the war that still conferred value in the eyes of consumers. One particularly bitter dispute concerned the BMW brand. Another concerned the national airline, known till 1945 as Deutsche Luft Hansa. Directly after the end of the Second World War, one thing on which the Soviet Union and the United States were able to agree was that no new German state should be permitted to operate an airline. The military implications of a German state having access to a permanent pool of trained pilots and air industry expertise were uppermost in the minds of politicians. However, geo-political priorities moved on, and in 1953 Lufthansa was founded, a West German airline with its primary hub reassuringly located next door to a massive US airbase south of Frankfurt am Main. In 1955 the East German government responded, staking a claim to the "Lufthansa" brand by creating Deutsche Lufthansa. Since the Lufthansa name had already been registered by the West German airline, the East German entity faced a succession of lawsuits and was, in the meantime, not able to register as a member of the International Air Transport Association. Eventually it would be rebranded as Interflug. In the meantime, reflecting the intensely political nature of the airline business, when Deutsche Lufthansa was created in 1955 it made sense that its Director in Chief should be the son of the aging East German President. On 1 July 1955 Arthur Pieck, who had no experience of flying or of the airline business, was appointed "Hauptdirektor" of the national airline.

=== Final years ===
President Wilhelm Pieck faded away and then, in September 1960, died. Arthur Pieck was close to his father both personally and in terms of his career: he was under no illusion that his career as a top airline executive would long outlive his father. It did not, and he went into semi-retirement. One or two less onerous appointments nevertheless still lay ahead. On 1 January 1961 he was appointed a Deputy Minister for Transport. On 15 March 1961 he was appointed Head of the Civil Aviation Board. He became a member of the East German delegation to the Standing Transport Commission of the Council for Mutual Economic Assistance ("Comecon"). He was also a member of the Committee of Antifascist Resistance Fighters.

In May 1965 Arthur Pieck went into full retirement at his own wish. He died in Berlin slightly less than five years later. He was cremated and honoured with burial in the Pergolenweg Ehrengrab section of Berlin's Friedrichsfelde Cemetery.

== Awards and honours ==
- 1955 Patriotic Order of Merit in silver
- 1957 Ernst Moritz Arndt Medal
- 1959 Banner of Labor
- 1960 Banner of Labor
- 1964 Patriotic Order of Merit in gold
- 1969 Patriotic Order of Merit gold clasp
