= Elly Winter =

East German politician (1898-1987)

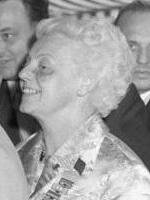
- Winter in 1959
- Born: Elly Pieck; 1 November 1898; Bremen, German Empire
- Died: 13 May 1987 (aged 88); East Berlin, East Germany
- Resting place: Zentralfriedhof Friedrichsfelde, Berlin
- Occupation: Politician
- Spouse: Theodor Winter (m. 1928; died 1944)
- Father: Wilhelm Pieck
- Relatives: Arthur Pieck (brother); Eleonore Staimer (sister)

Elly Winter (née Pieck; 1 November 1898 – 13 May 1987) was a German communist and notable political activist. The eldest daughter of East German president Wilhelm Pieck, Elly Winter was a longtime activist in the anti-fascist movement and was a well-recognized member of the Socialist Unity Party (SED) in East Germany after the Allied triumph over Nazism.

== Biography ==
The first-born daughter of German Marxist activist and Social Democrat Wilhelm Pieck, Winter was born Elly Pieck in Bremen on 1 November 1898.

Politically active from an early age, she joined the Communist Party of Germany (KPD) in 1919 (Wilhelm Pieck had joined the newly founded Communist Party in 1918). She married Theodor Winter, a fellow activist in the Communist Party.

Upon the Nazis' seizure of power in 1933, the Pieck family fled from the Third Reich. Having successfully obtained asylum in the Soviet Union, they stayed in Soviet territory until the 1945 surrender of Nazi Germany in World War II.

Theodor Winter, who fought the Nazis in armed struggle, was arrested by the Gestapo and executed during the Second World War.

Back in Germany, Winter settled in the Soviet zone of Allied-occupied Germany, rejoining the Communist Party of Germany and becoming a member of the Socialist Unity Party (SED) upon the merger of the Communists and Social Democrats in eastern Germany in the process of the Communists' consolidation of power in the East.

The Socialist Unity Party elected Wilhelm Pieck to assume the function of president in newly formed German Democratic Republic (East Germany) in 1949, and Winter continued to act as an assistant and personal secretary to her father, caring for him in his last period of illness just prior to his death in 1960. She managed his personal archives thereafter.

Concurrently, Winter was a leading member of the Institute for Marxism-Leninism of the Central Committee of the Socialist Unity Party of Germany in East Berlin, where she died in 1987.

For her long service in political work appreciated by East Germany, Winter was recognized with various awards, including two medals of the Vaterländischer Verdienstorden and the Medal for Fighters Against Fascism. She was cremated and honoured with burial in the Pergolenweg Ehrengrab section of Berlin's Friedrichsfelde Cemetery.
