= Eleonore Staimer =

German politician (1906–1998)

- Born: Eleonore Pieck; 14 April 1906; Bremen, German Empire
- Died: 7 November 1998 (aged 92); Berlin, Germany
- Occupations: Office worker Party official Trade envoy Deputy minister Ambassador
- Political party: KPD; SED
- Spouses: Josef Springer (m. 1939–1945) Richard Staimer (m. 1947–1954)
- Parents: Wilhelm Pieck (1876–1960) (father); Christine Häfker (1876–1936) (mother)
- Relatives: Elly Winter (sister); Arthur Pieck (brother)

Eleonore Staimer (née Pieck: 14 April 1906 – 7 November 1998) was a German Communist Party activist and official. After 1945 she undertook work for the KPD and SED Party, later becoming an East German diplomat. She served as her country's first Ambassador to Yugoslavia between 1966 and 1969.

She was Wilhelm Pieck's youngest daughter.

== Life ==
=== Family provenance ===
Eleonore "Lore" Staimer, the youngest of her parents' three recorded children, was born in Bremen, one of Germany's largest port cities, at a time of accelerating social and political change, driven by rapid industrial and commercial expansion. Wilhelm Pieck, her father, was an active trades unionist and an instinctively adept political strategist. He was a carpenter by training and profession, but the year before Eleonore's birth he had taken a full-time position as party secretary with the by now increasingly mainstream Social Democratic Party (SPD). Her mother, born Christine Häfker, had been a garments worker at the time of her marriage, and also at some point worked as a "home worker" for a Bremen cigarette factory: Christine Häfker appears to have grown up in a relatively unpoliticised household.

=== Early years ===
Eleonore attended junior school briefly during 1912/13 in Berlin-Steglitz, after which the family evidently returned to Bremen where she attended middle school ("Bürgerschule") between 1913 and 1918. It was presumably in connection with her father's political involvement that in 1918/19 she was back in Berlin-Steglitz for her final year at school. Pieck had been on the anti-war wing of the SPD from the outset, and powerfully vocal in his opposition to the party's parliamentary support for war funding: Wilhelm Pieck joined the new Communist Party in January 1919, two and a half week after its launch. Eleonore Pieck as still only 14 when she joined the Young Communists later that year. She had already been a member of its socialist precursor organisation since 1918. More usually, in view of her age, sources also indicated that she joined the Communist Party in 1920.

While still at school Elenore Pieck attended a succession of business college evening classes, undertaking courses in shorthand, typing, and book-keeping. There is also reference to half a year spent at a "household school" ("Haushaltsschule"), presumably mastering "domestic sciences". Between 1920 and March 1923 Elenore Pieck found office work with a succession of businesses.

=== Party worker / party official ===
In April 1923 she took a job as secretary-assistant to Leo Flieg, who at that time was one of two secretaries to the Organisation Office ("Orgbüro") of the party politburo - effectively the party's ruling committee of the party. She moved on to work as secretary-assistant to Gustav Menzel, a left-leaning lawyer who since 1921 had served as one of 31 communist members in the 421 seat Prussian Landtag (parliament). Mentzel's principal focus in the parliament was on securing proper treatment of political prisoners, but there are indications that Elenore Pieck's duties were relatively broadly based, and that her work for the parliament involved providing secretarial and administrative support to the entire Communist group in it.

1930 brought a change of direction, when Eleanore Pieck went to work for the (implausibly large) Soviet trade mission in Berlin. In 1932 she was sent to Moscow where she worked for the "Peoples' Commissariat for Foreign Trade". However, at the end of that year or the start of 1933 her contract was terminated "due to the insufficiency of [her] language skills".

=== Hitler years and Moscow exile ===
In January 1933 the Hitler government took power and quickly transformed Germany into a one-party dictatorship. By the end of February 1933 it was clear that known Communist Party activist members were at particular risk of enhanced surveillance by the security services, targeted government persecution and worse. Eleanore Pieck appears to have stayed on in Moscow despite no longer being employed by the Foreign Trade commission. Her parents and siblings all fled Germany during 1933, and by the end of 1935 they all seem to have been based in Moscow. Eleanore's mother died from a recurrence of her by now chronic pneumonia in a Moscow clinic at the start of December 1936. (The urn containing her ashes was returned to Germany in 1956.)

By 1934 Eleanore Pieck was working as a typing assistant with the "Comintern Youth" organisation and the "Internationaler Revolutionärer Theaterbund", which had been set up a few years earlier by her brother. Starting in 1934 she is identified as an "Agitprop Secretary". Between 1936 and 1940 she was in charge of the finance department for International Red Aid ("Междунаро́дная организа́ция по́мощи борца́м револю́ции" / (МОПР)), a highly politicised international workers' welfare association that had been set up in 1922 under the auspices of the Comintern, of which her father served an Executive Committee member between November 1937 and the dissolution of the МОПР in 1941.

In June 1941 the German army invaded the Soviet Union in defiance of the 1939 non-aggression pact between the dictators. Over the next few months the Soviet government implemented long-standing contingency plans for the evacuation of Moscow. Eleanore Pieck had married Josef Springer in 1939. In October 1941 she was evacuated, along with most or all the members of the Comintern apparatus, to Ufa in Bashkortostan, presumably accompanied by her husband, whom she had met through the Comintern. Her father was also among those evacuated to Ufa. During 1941/42 she was enrolled as a student at the Kushnarenkovo Comintern school which had opened up (disguised as an Agricultural College) when the Comintern evacuees had arrived from Moscow.

Many of the political refugees from Germany who had settled in Moscow during the 1930s in order to get away from Hitler, and then been evacuated with the native Muscovites in 1941, were left in their remote places of exile for years. Others joined the hundreds of thousands of prisoners of war who had survived monumental military defeat at Stalingrad, only to end up in the Soviet camps. Party General Secretary Stalin was a famously mistrustful man at the best of times, and the arrival of three million well-equipped German soldiers on Soviet territory in June 1941, together with the ensuing slaughter and destruction, had evidently made him more mistrustful than ever of German people. But there were still a few German comrades whom he trusted. Wilhelm Pieck (who had been seriously ill as an evacuee in Bachkiria) returned to Moscow on 27 March 1942. It is not clear whether Eleonore and her husband accompanied him, but she was certainly back in Moscow by the end of 1942. During 1942/43 she was employed with International Red Aid as head of the department for Political Emigrants in the organisation's Soviet section. During 1943 she was recruited by the People's Commissariat for Internal Affairs (Interior Ministry) to join a radio editorial team, as plans were drawn up for a German language radio station, intended to attend to the perceived (by the ministry) needs of the many German prisoners of War detained in the Soviet camps.

After 1942 the likely outcome of the war became easier to predict, and over the next couple of years German defeat appeared ever more clearly on the horizon. In 1944 Eleonore became secretary to Anton Ackermann, a leading member of the (all-male) group of 30 trusted comrades working away in Moscow on the preparation a formidably detailed nation building programme, to be implemented in Germany once the National Socialist tyranny had been destroyed. (In the event it would be implemented only in the central third of Germany, administered from May 1945 as the Soviet occupation zone.) Later she also took an appointment as Youth Editor with the recently launched Moscow based broadcaster, "Radio Free Germany".

=== Post-war developments ===
Eleonore Springer returned to Germany on 28 May 1945 accompanied by fellow activist Margarete Lode (1902–1952), who subsequently became her sister-in-law, marrying Arthur Pieck in November 1945. (Her father had already arrived in Berlin with the Soviet army at the end of April 1945.) She moved at once to Stettin, at the north-eastern end of the Soviet occupation zone, where she stayed for a couple of months, undertaking various political jobs. She is described in a source as a party instructor, working on behalf of the ten member Gustav Sobottka sub-group of the thirty member Ulbricht Group of Soviet sponsored "nation builders". There is also a reference to her having worked as part of the editorial team for the (very short-lived) Stettin-based Deutsche Zeitung (newspaper). On 5 July 1945 the military occupation forces choreographed the transfer of Stettin from the Soviet zone of Germany to Poland, triggering another bout of ethnic cleansing in the process. Till August 1945 Elenore remained in the north of the Soviet occupation zone, now based in Schwerin, and a member of the party leadership team ("KPD-Landesleitung") for the newly established state of Mecklenburg-Vorpommern. Initially she was deputy chair of the culture department, but as the party organisational structure rapidly evolved she was transferred in August 1945 to the business section of the secretariat and the national secretariat of the Communist Party and then, after April 1946, of the Socialist Unity Party ("Sozialistische Einheitspartei Deutschlands" / SED) which replaced it. This brought her closer to the centre of political power under the highly centralised Leninist government structure that had emerged by 1949 in what had become a new kind of German one-party dictatorship. By this time she had been released from her job, in April, 1949 "due to illness".

=== Trade ministry ===
By September 1949 she was sufficiently recovered to embark on a new chapter, accepting a leadership appointment in the Foreign Trade department of the East German Ministry for Intra-German Trade, Foreign Trade and Materials Supplies. Between October 1953 and January 1957 she served as secretary of state and deputy minister.

=== Diplomatic service ===
In January 1958 she switched to the diplomatic service, sent as the East German permanent representative to Belgrade. Yugoslavia had become politically distanced from the Soviet Union during the 1950s, and the diplomatic relationship between Yugoslavia and the Soviet Union's central European "allies" was a correspondingly low-key affair. During the 1960s a slow and tentative rapprochement began, however, and in October 1966 Eleonore Staimer became East Germany's first ever ambassador to Yugoslavia, remaining in the post till February 1969. Her next posting was back in Berlin where she worked at the Ministry for Foreign Affairs till October 1970.

=== Later years ===
In November 1970 she became deputy director of the East German travel office, with her responsibilities focused on relationships with foreign travellers, publicity work and market research.

She retired in 1975, following which she became actively engaged as a member of the Berlin committee of Anti-fascist resistance fighters, a heavily politicised patriotic-nationalistic organisation with close links to the ruling party. She was cremated and buried with her mother in the Pergolenweg section of Berlin's Friedrichsfelde Cemetery.

== Personal ==
Eleanor Pieck married Josef Springer in 1939. She had met him through her work with the Comintern. The marriage reportedly lasted till 1945. There is no reference to Springer having accompanied his wife when she returned from the Soviet Union to Germany in 1945. Between 1947 and 1954 she was married to Richard Staimer. The two of them had been evacuated to Ufa from Moscow in 1941, and had presumably got to know each other at that time. Available sources are almost entirely silent about both marriages.

== Awards and honours ==
- 1964 Banner of Labor
- 1966 Patriotic Order of Merit in gold
- 1971 Patriotic Order of Merit gold clasp
- 1976 Star of People's Friendship in gold
- 1981 Order of Karl Marx
