= Erich Raddatz =

German politician (1886–1964)

Erich Raddatz (28 November 1886 – 16 February 1964) was a Berlin city politician and parliamentarian. He was a founder member of the Communist Party, but was among those excluded from it in 1931 after openly opposing the leadership's adoption of Stalin's "social fascism" doctrine. After the war he returned to the Social Democratic Party with which he had broken over its support for the war back in 1917. He remained active in city politics well into his 70s, by which time he had become known to Berliners as "Papa Raddatz".

== Life ==
=== Provenance and early years ===
Erich Raddatz was born into a Protestant family in Konikow (as the village of Konikowo was known at that time) in the coastal county of Köslin, roughly halfway between Stettin and Danzig. He completed an apprenticeship as a skilled metal worker and, while still relatively young, came to Berlin. He joined the trades union in 1907 and in 1910 became a member of the Social Democratic Party ("Sozialdemokratische Partei Deutschlands" / SPD).

=== War and opposition to it ===
Raddatz participated in the First World War, serving as a soldier between 1916 and 1918. The decision by the SPD leadership to support war funding in a Reichstag (German parliament) vote in 1914 had been controversial with party members from the outset and set a pattern which persisted through the four years of the war. As the slaughter of war increased and austerity on the home front intensified anti-war sentiment in Germany grew ever stronger, especially on the political left. In 1917 the SPD split over the issue. Erich Raddatz was one of those who moved across to the breakaway Independent Social Democratic Party ("Unabhängige Sozialdemokratische Partei Deutschlands" / USPD). It was as a USPD member that he took work as a local government official in the city district of Berlin-Neukölln, subsequently promoted to the position of "welfare inspector" ("Stadtinspektor im Fürsorgewesen").

=== Communist party official ===
In the revolutionary turmoil of 1918/1919 the USPD in its turn broke apart, with a majority of members drawing inspiration from Russia's at this stage widely celebrated October Revolution and joining Germany's own recently launched Communist Party. In 1920 Erich Raddatz switched his own party allegiance, serving as a Communist member of the local council for Neukölln between 1920 and 1925. He continued to sit on the Neukölln council between 1926 and 1930, but now in an unpaid capacity. Between 1928 and 1932 he also served as a member of the "Magistrat" which under the terms of the 1920 "Greater Berlin Law" was a municipal executive body with (limited) powers and responsibilities covering the entire city.

=== Prussian parliament ===
In 1928 Wilhelm Pieck, already a leading figure in the Communist Party, gave up his seat in the Prussian parliament ("Landtag"), having been elected to the German parliament ("Reichstag") in May's general election. In June 1928 Raddatz was selected to take over the Landtag seat vacated by his party comrade, representing a Potsdam electoral district ("Wahlkreis 3"). In the course party ructions during 1930/31 Raddatz was excluded from the party. He nevertheless continued to sit as a member of the Landtag till the 1932 state election.

=== Group of 60 ===
The 1929 Wall Street crash brought the Great Depression which hit the German economy badly. As unemployment surged, politics became ever more polarised. Within the Communist Party, opinions were sharply divided between those who saw the populist National Socialist party under Adolf Hitler as the principal political danger to the party and the country, and those - taking their lead from Moscow - who insisted that the greater danger came from the centre-left Social Democratic Party, because it represented a more potent roadblock along the route to the dictatorship of the proletariat. The party leader, Ernst Thälmann, and those comrades with whom he had surrounded himself in positions of leadership in the party central committee since 1925, were unwavering in their view that the greater danger lay in attempting to reach any sort of accommodation with the Social Democrats. After 1933 commentators would increasingly express the view that Thälmann had badly underestimated the seductive populist skills of Adolf Hitler. Three years before that, on 28 February 1930, a group of 60 Berlin party activists and officials addressed an open letter to Thälmann in which they criticised the leadership's favoured "social fascism" doctrine.

The "Group of 60" were immediately excluded from the party, becoming in effect a group of 60 independent Berlin communists. The Berlin city councillor Hermann Letz and Erich Raddatz found themselves the de facto co-leaders of the group. They lost no time in issuing their own newsletter. It quickly became apparent, however, that there could be no political future for a group of 60 party activists independent of a resolutely extremist Communist Party, and with no alternative political home. On 26 February 1931 the SPD party newspaper, Vorwärts, reported that "30 former communists [including Erich Raddatz] are joining the Social Democratic Party". Raddatz now devoted his considerable political energies to canvassing trades unionist comrades still in the Communist Party, urging them to switch away from the ever more inflexible party which, in the eyes of many, was by this time taking all its orders from Moscow.

=== 12 years under Hitler ===
Regime change arrived in January 1933 and was followed by a rapid transformation of Germany into a one-party dictatorship. Political involvement as a Communist or Social Democrat was outlawed. The security services were particularly unstinting in their surveillance of those with any record of involvement with the now illegal Communist Party. Raddetz lost his job with the Berlin city council and fell back on his factory training and skills, working as a clerk in a metals processing factory in Berlin-Lichtenberg, and promoted later to a job as a foreman-supervisor. There is no mention in sources of any political activity or engagement by Erich Raddatz during the twelve Hitler years.

=== New beginnings ===
War ended in May 1945, and with it the one-party Hitler dictatorship. Raddatz re-joined the re-emerging SPD in June 1945 and was appointed to lead the social affairs department for Berlin-Neukölln. The western two thirds of Germany were now divided into four military zones of occupation. For Berlin, set in the middle of the Soviet occupation zone, separate arrangements had been agreed between the allied leaders, although many practical decisions over how the city would be administered had been left ambiguous, reflecting the inability of the so-called "Big Three" to agree the details between themselves. Berlin was divided into four sectors, each under the military administration of one or other of the victorious powers. Neukölln was in the American zone, and in November 1945 the American military administration confirmed Raddatz in his post as "Bezirksstadtrat" (loosely, "District city councillor") for social affairs. He would continue to hold the job through a succession of political reconfigurations, till his retirement in January 1959.

=== A "new" party ===
In April 1946 a contentious merger took place between the Communist Party and the Social Democratic Party. It is possible that the architects of the merger intended or hoped that it would take effect in all four occupation zones. In the event it only ever took effect, with full backing from the military administration, in Germany's Soviet occupation zone. Berlin, as in so much else during this period, was an exception in various ways. In the longer term the party merger would only endure in the eastern sector of the city, which was contiguous with, and to the extent possible administered after 1945 as part of, the Soviet zone. Justification for the merger came from a widespread consciousness that the divisions on the political left during the early 1930s had opened the way for National Socialism to triumph in 1933. The product of the merger was the Socialist Unity Party ("Sozialistische Einheitspartei Deutschlands" / SED) which, if only within the Soviet zone, rapidly became the ruling party in a new kind of German one-party dictatorship, closely modelled on the Leninist structure devised for the Soviet Union. Across the Soviet zone hundreds of thousands of Communists and a large number of Social Democrats rushed to sign their party memberships across to the SED. In Berlin's three western sectors enthusiasm for the party merger among Social Democrats was more muted. Many, even in 1946, suspected that the SED might somehow become a vehicle for Soviet imperialist ambitions. But among those who had campaigned most strongly during the early 1930s - in the teeth of opposition emanating from the Soviet Union - for closer collaboration between Communists and Social Democrats there were, even in the American, British and French sectors of Berlin, those who swallowed their doubts and signed their political allegiance across from the SPD to the new party. Erich Raddatz was one of these. By 20 October 1946 his name was included on the list of SED candidates in local council elections for Neukölln. He succeeded in being elected, and retained his post as "Bezirksstadtrat", no longer simply through nomination, but now endorsed in the election.

In the immediate postwar period it was possible to believe that the division of Germany into four separately administered zones might be a relatively short term expedient. After 1948 it became harder to believe in German reunification as a practical proposition. The events leading up to the 1948 Berlin Blockade made it clear that reunification on Soviet terms could never be acceptable to the United States and reunification on western terms could never be acceptable to the Soviet Union. Through the 1950s Cold War tensions grew, leaving Germany with one of the most technically sophisticated and deadly borders in the world, not on its outer edge, but down its middle. In August 1948 Erich Raddatz left the SED and returned, again, to the Social Democratic Party. Over the next few years he found himself singled out for media criticism from East German media, but his popularity in his West Berlin home base seems not to have suffered from his record of sometimes choosing the "wrong" party. By the time of his retirement from his council duties in 1959 he was becoming known by the affectionate soubriquet "Papa Raddatz", or even "Opa {Grandpa} Raddatz". Along with his social affairs portfolio as "Bezirksstadtrat", between 1955 and 1959 he also served as deputy mayor of Neukölln.

=== Final years ===
Raddatz lived on another five years after his retirement, during which time he served as a "hands-on" regional vice president for the Berlin AWO ("Workers' Welfare") association. Following a serious operation, he died in West Berlin on 16 February 1964.
