= Zentralfriedhof Friedrichsfelde =

Cemetery in Berlin

Coordinates: 52°30′56″N 13°30′38″E

Friedrichsfelde Central Cemetery
- Zentralfriedhof Friedrichsfelde
- Interactive map of Friedrichsfelde Central Cemetery

Details
- Established: 1881
- Location: Lichtenberg, Berlin, Germany
- Size: 78.25 acres

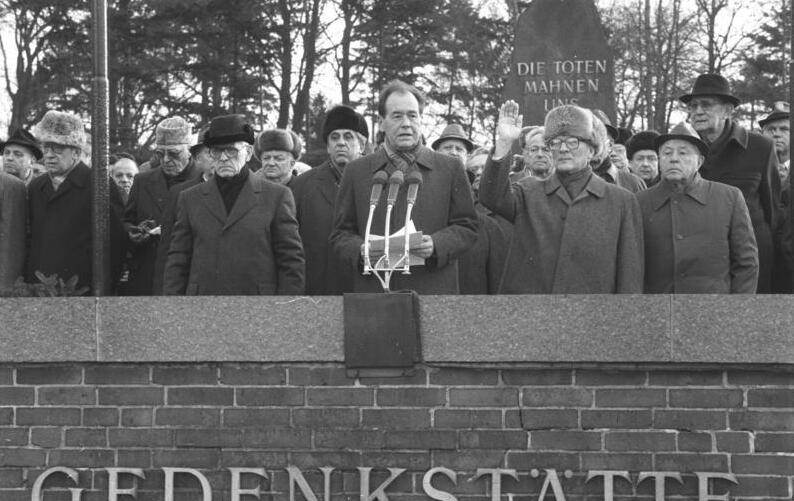
Speech at the 1951 Memorial to the Socialists commemorating Rosa Luxemburg, with Honecker, Mielke, Krenz and other high-ranking GDR leaders, January 1989

Friedrichsfelde Central Cemetery (German: Zentralfriedhof Friedrichsfelde) is a cemetery in the borough of Lichtenberg in Berlin. It was the cemetery used for many of Berlin's Socialists, Communists, and anti-fascist fighters.

== History ==
When the cemetery was founded in 1881 it was called the Friedrichsfelde Municipal Cemetery Berlin (German: Berliner Gemeindefriedhof Friedrichsfelde). The cemetery was modelled on Hamburg's Ohlsdorf Cemetery. In 1900, with the burial of Wilhelm Liebknecht, founder of the Social Democratic Party (SPD), the cemetery became the resting place for many of the leaders and activists of Germany's social democratic, socialist and communist movements. In 1919, the coffins of Karl Liebknecht and Rosa Luxemburg, co-founders of the Communist Party of Germany were buried in a mass grave in a remote section of the cemetery. A 2009 Charité autopsy report however cast doubt on whether Rosa Luxemburg's remains were ever buried there.

The division of Berlin following the Second World War caused the cemetery to be within the borders of East Berlin, where it was used to bury East German (GDR) leaders, such as Walter Ulbricht and Wilhelm Pieck, the first President of the GDR.

In 2006 a monument to the victims of Stalinism was erected.

== Zentralfriedhof Friedrichsfelde as "Socialist Cemetery" ==
=== The 1926 Monument to the Revolution ===
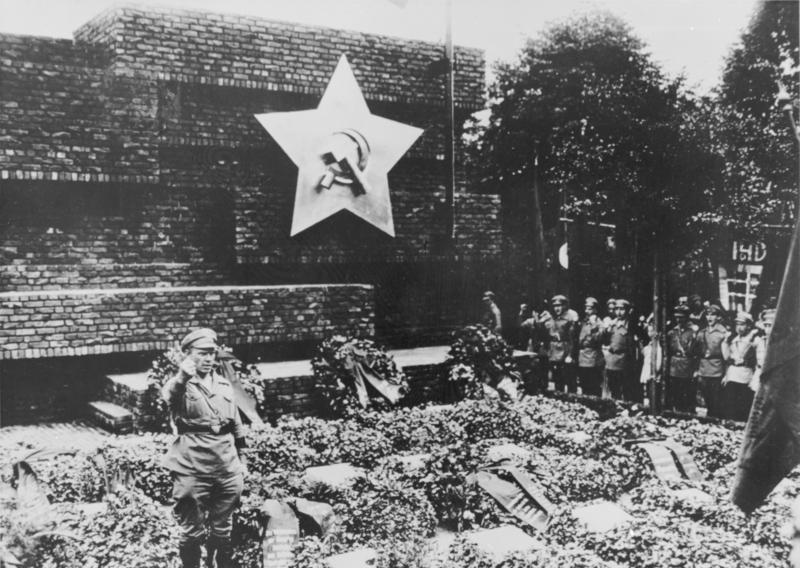
A memorial to the fallen Spartacists, designed by Ludwig Mies van der Rohe in 1926; after 1935 destroyed by the Third Reich. On the left: Ernst Thälmann

Unveiled in 1926, the Monument to the Revolution was erected in front of the mass grave where the coffins of Karl Liebknecht and Rosa Luxemburg had been interred in 1919. Designed by architect and future Bauhaus director, Ludwig Mies van der Rohe, it was a 12 m (39 ft) wide and 6 m (20 ft) high red brick monument which the National Socialists destroyed in January 1935.

=== The 1951 Memorial to the Socialists ===
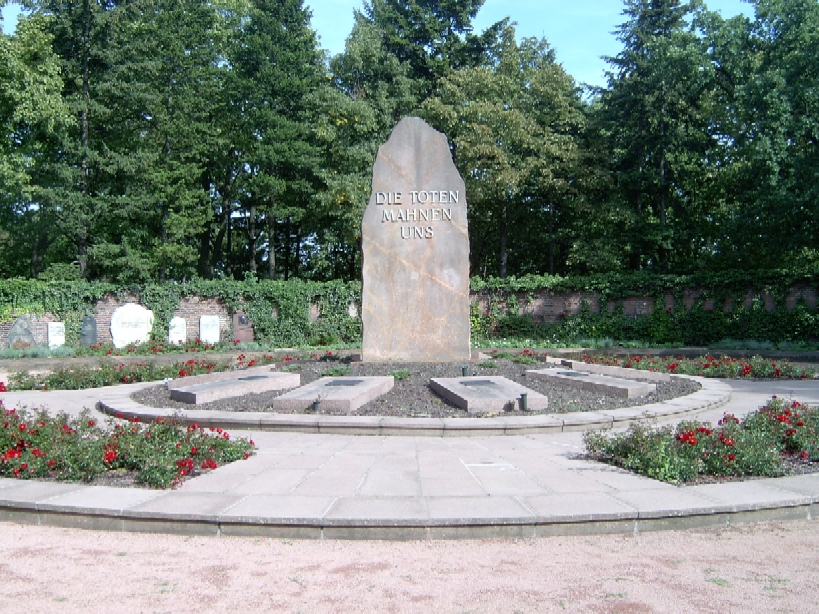
Central garden roundel with porphyry stele and inner circle of 10 graves

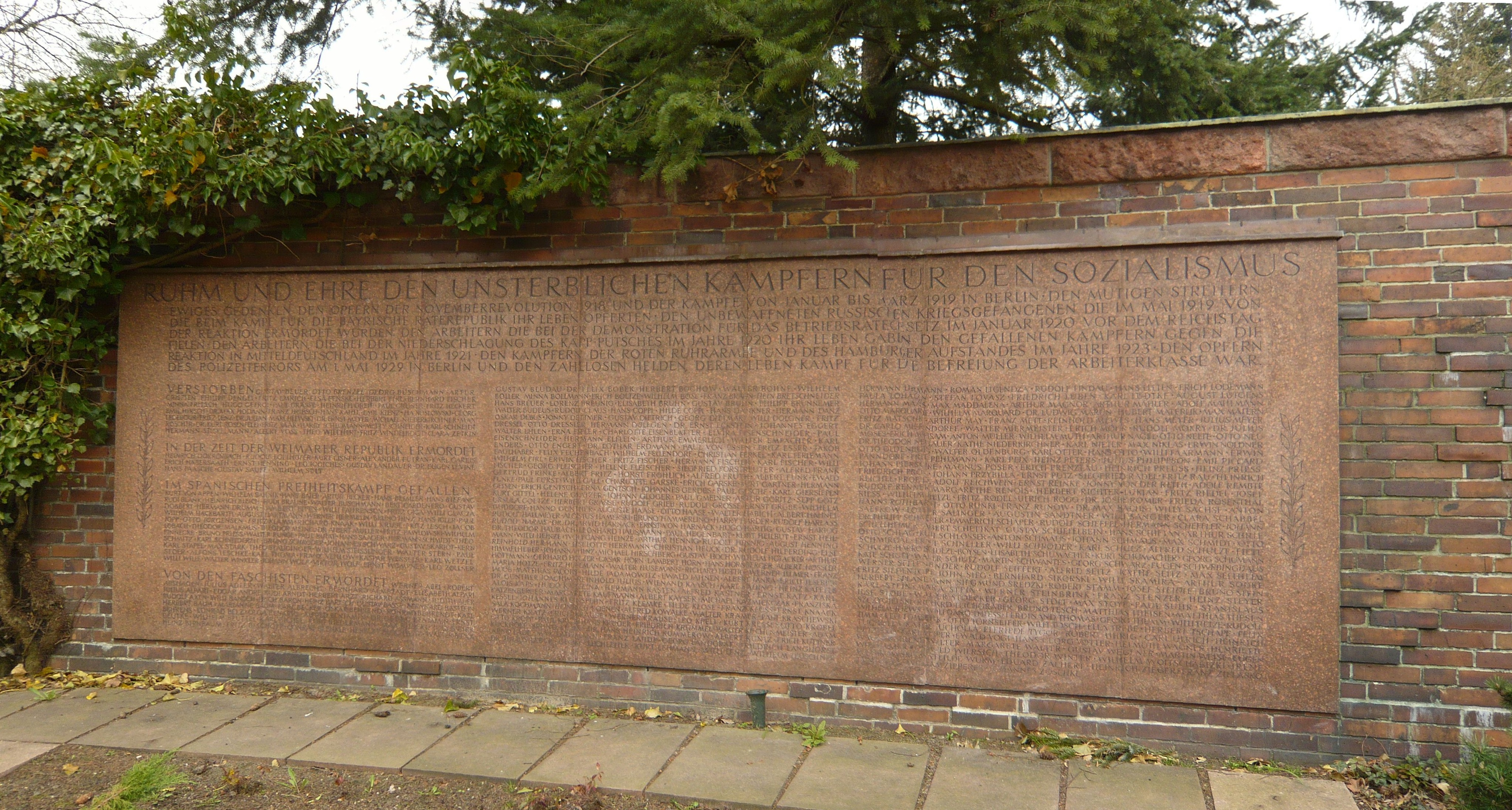
Red marble tablet recording the names of 327 men and women who died fighting Fascism between 1933 and 1945

The current Memorial to the Socialists (German: Gedenkstätte der Sozialisten) stands close to the cemetery's main gate and was inaugurated by Wilhelm Pieck in 1951. Although constructed at a significant distance from the site once occupied by the 1926 Monument to the Revolution, the 1951 memorial was planned as its "moral successor" and as central memorial site for East Germany's Socialists, Communists and anti-fascist fighters. Until 1989, decisions whether a person should be buried in the Memorial to the Socialists or the adjacent Pergolenweg section of the cemetery rested solely with the Politburo of the Socialist Unity Party of Germany, and many honoured this way were also given a state funeral.

The 1951 Memorial to the Socialists consists of a central garden roundel surrounded by a semi-circular brick wall. The central garden roundel is dominated by a porphyry stele or obelisk with the words Die Toten mahnen uns (English: The dead remind us), which is surrounded by 10 graves commemorating foremost socialist leaders, namely: Karl Liebknecht, Rosa Luxemburg, Ernst Thälmann, Wilhelm Pieck, Walter Ulbricht, Franz Mehring, John Schehr, Rudolf Breitscheid, Franz Künstler (politician), and Otto Grotewohl. Into the semi-circular brick wall are set gravestones and niches containing the urns of distinguished Socialists and Communists. Also in the semi-circular brick wall is a large red marble tablet recording the names of 327 men and women who gave their lives in the cause of fighting Fascism between 1933 and 1945. Included in the list are Hans Coppi, Hilde Coppi, Heinrich Koenen, Arvid Harnack, Harro Schulze-Boysen, John Sieg, and Ilse Stöbe.

Immediately behind the semi-circular brick wall of the Memorial to the Socialists lies the Pergolenweg Ehrengrab section of the cemetery. Here are buried the urns of Socialists, Communists and anti-fascist fighters of merit who were considered distinguished enough by the Politburo of the Socialist Unity Party of Germany to rest in the vicinity of the foremost party leaders yet not as eminent as to entitle them to a grave in the Memorial to the Socialists itself. People buried in the Pergolenweg section could also have the urns of up to three family members buried with them.

== Notable interments (selection) ==
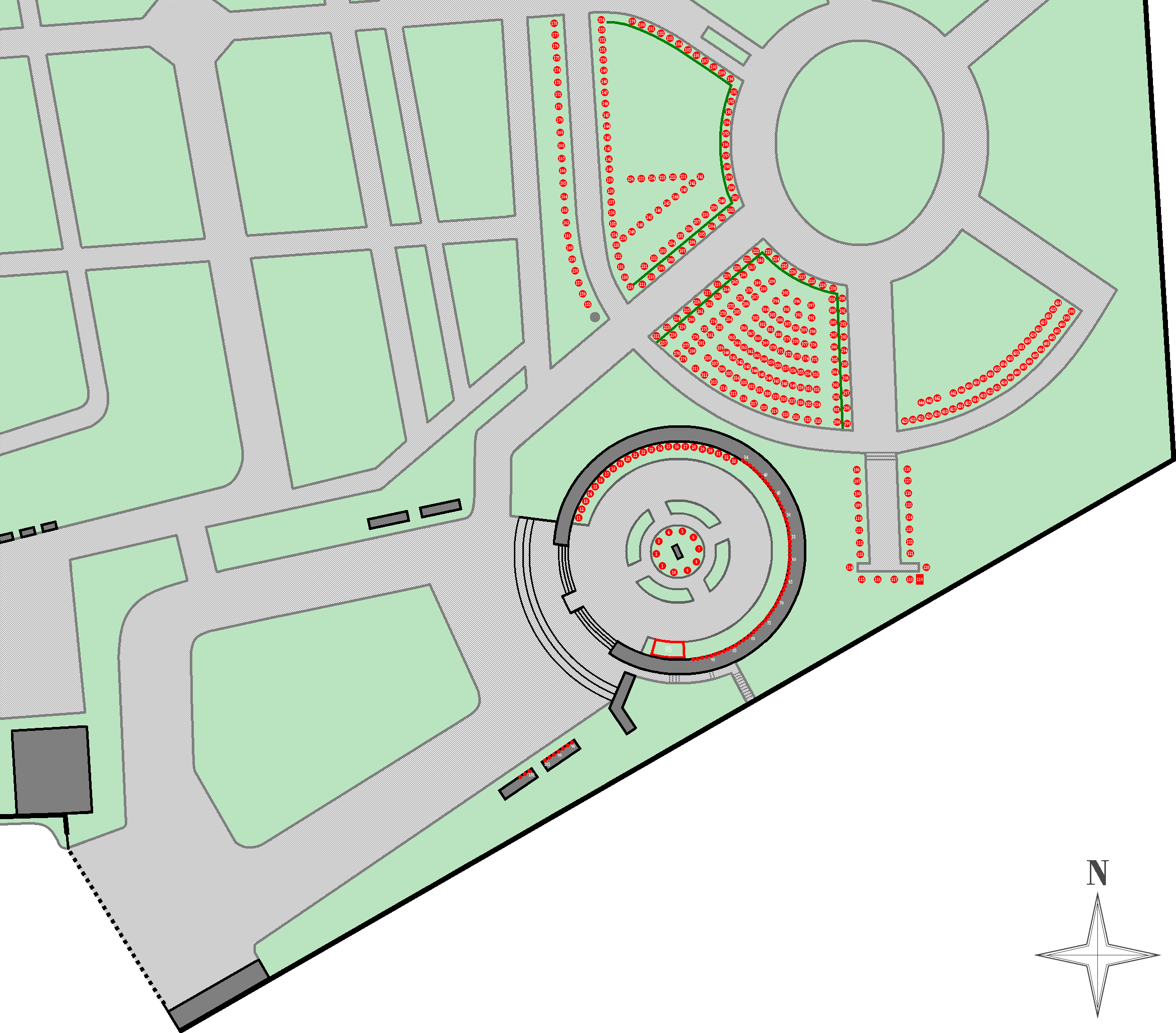
Location of graves (red) in the Memorial to the Socialists proper and in the adjacent Pergolenweg section

=== Memorial to the Socialists ===
- Willi Bredel (1901–1964)
- Rudolf Breitscheid (1874–1944) (cenotaph, body buried in the Stahnsdorf South-Western Cemetery)
- Georg Ewald (1926–1973)
- Otto Grotewohl (1894–1964)
- Hugo Haase (1863–1919)
- Katharina Kern (1900–1985)
- Franz Künstler (politician) (1888–1942) (cenotaph, body buried in Friedhof Baumschulenweg)
- Carl Legien (1861–1920)
- Theodor Leipart (1867–1947)
- Wilhelm Liebknecht (1826–1900)
- Karl Liebknecht (1871–1919) (cenotaph, body buried in different part of the cemetery)
- Rosa Luxemburg (1871–1919) (cenotaph, body not identified)
- Franz Mehring (1846–1919)
- Wilhelm Pieck (1876–1960)
- Heinrich Rau (1899–1961)
- John Schehr (1896–1934)
- Rudolf Schwarz (1904–1934)
- Paul Singer (1844–1911)
- Ernst Thälmann (1886–1944) (cenotaph, body cremated at KZ Buchenwald)
- Arthur Ewert (1890–1959)
- Walter Ulbricht (1893–1973)
- Erich Weinert (1890–1953)
- Friedrich Wolf (1888–1953)
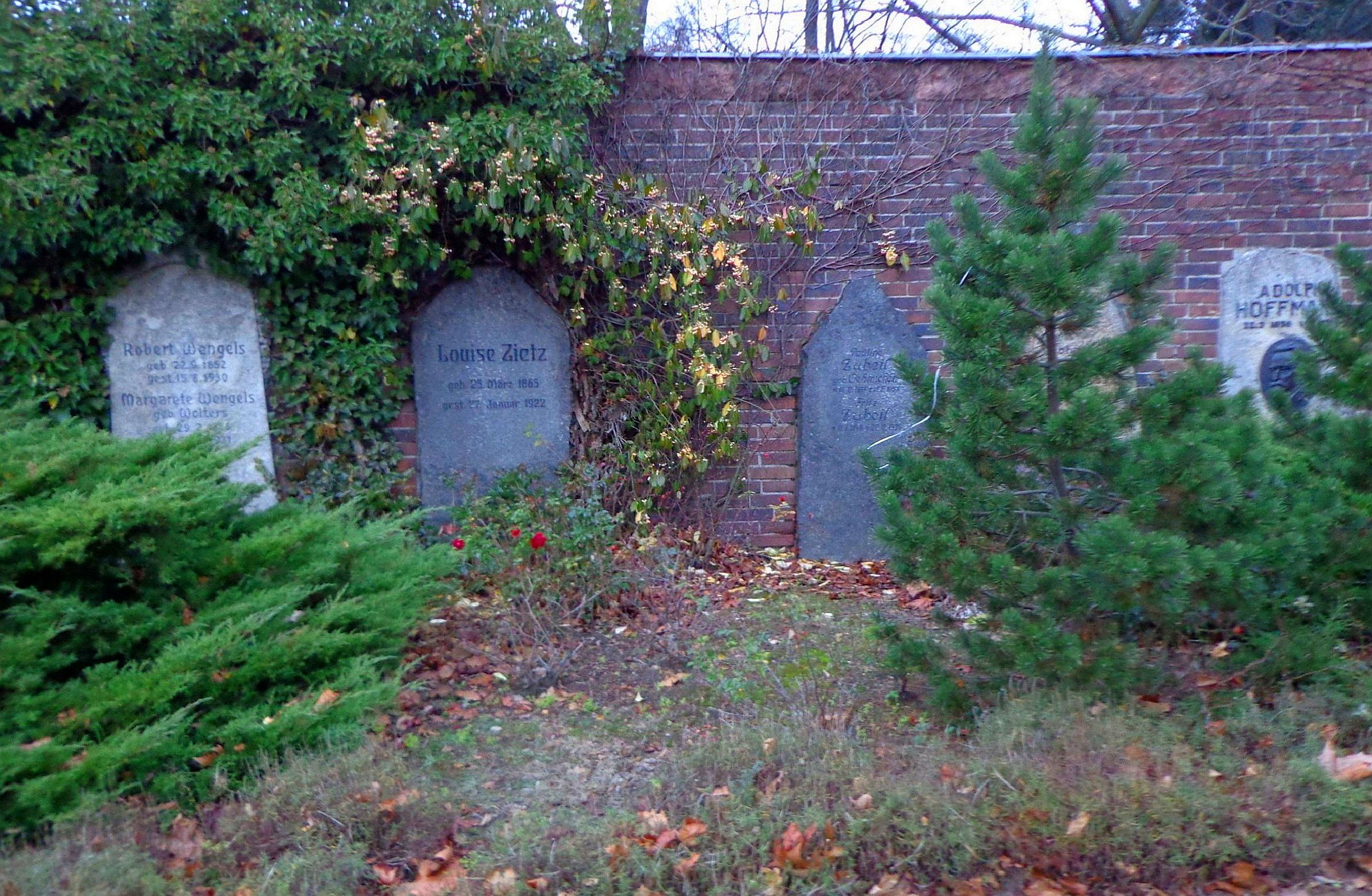
semi-circular brick wall, left side with gravestones

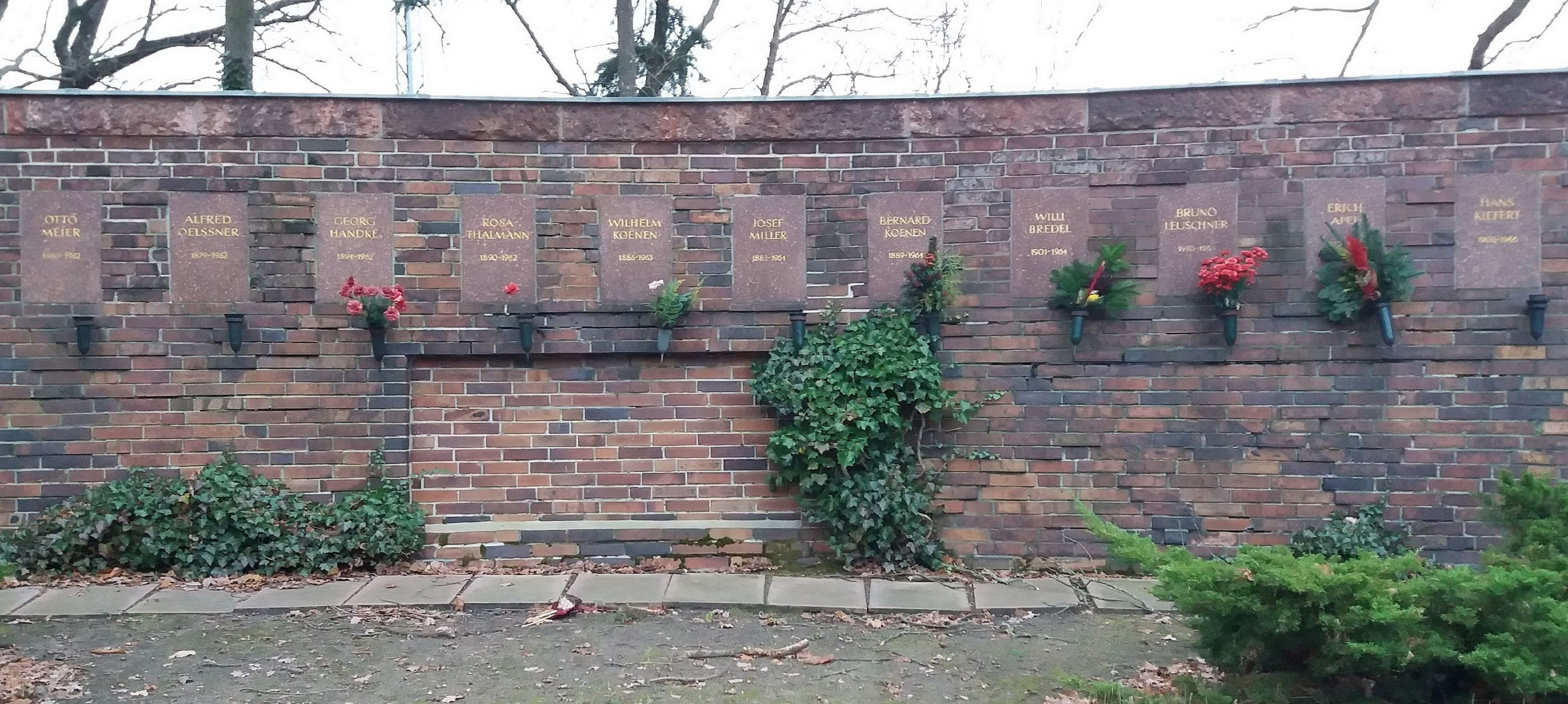
semi-circular brick wall, right side with urn niches

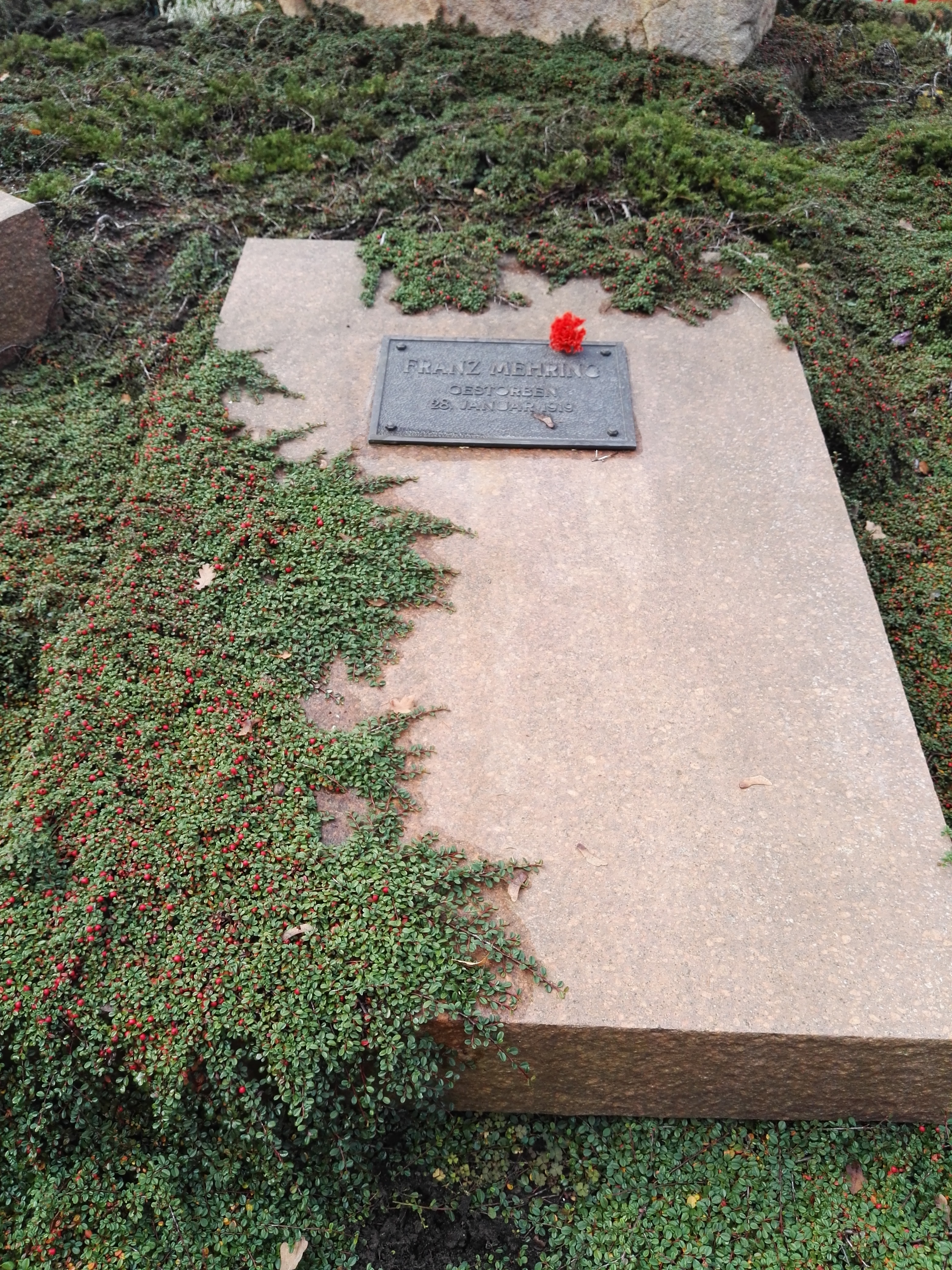
Franz Mehring (1846–1919)

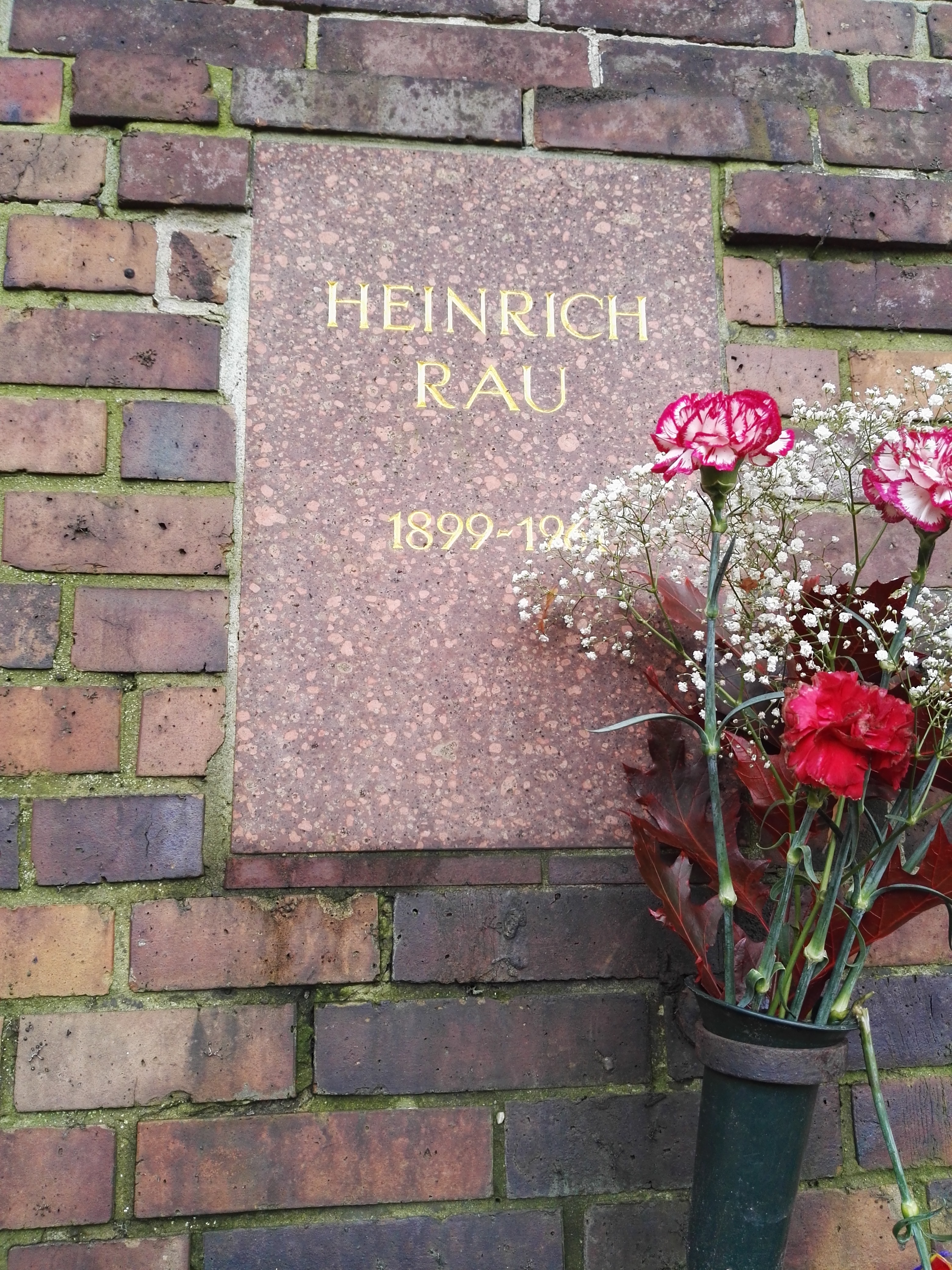
Heinrich Rau (1899–1961)

=== Pergolenweg section ===
- Kunwar Mohammad Ashraf (1903–1962)
- Hilde Benjamin (1902–1989)
- Klaus Fuchs (1911–1988), theoretical physicist and atomic spy
- Adolf Hennecke (1905–1975)
- Greta Kuckhoff (1902–1981)
- Hans Marchwitza (1890–1965)
- Arthur Pieck (1899–1970)
- Willy Sägebrecht (1904–1981)
- Eleonore Staimer (1906–1998)
- Elly Winter (1898–1987)
- Konrad Wolf (1925–1982)
- Markus Wolf (1923–2006)
- Ernst Wollweber (1898–1967)
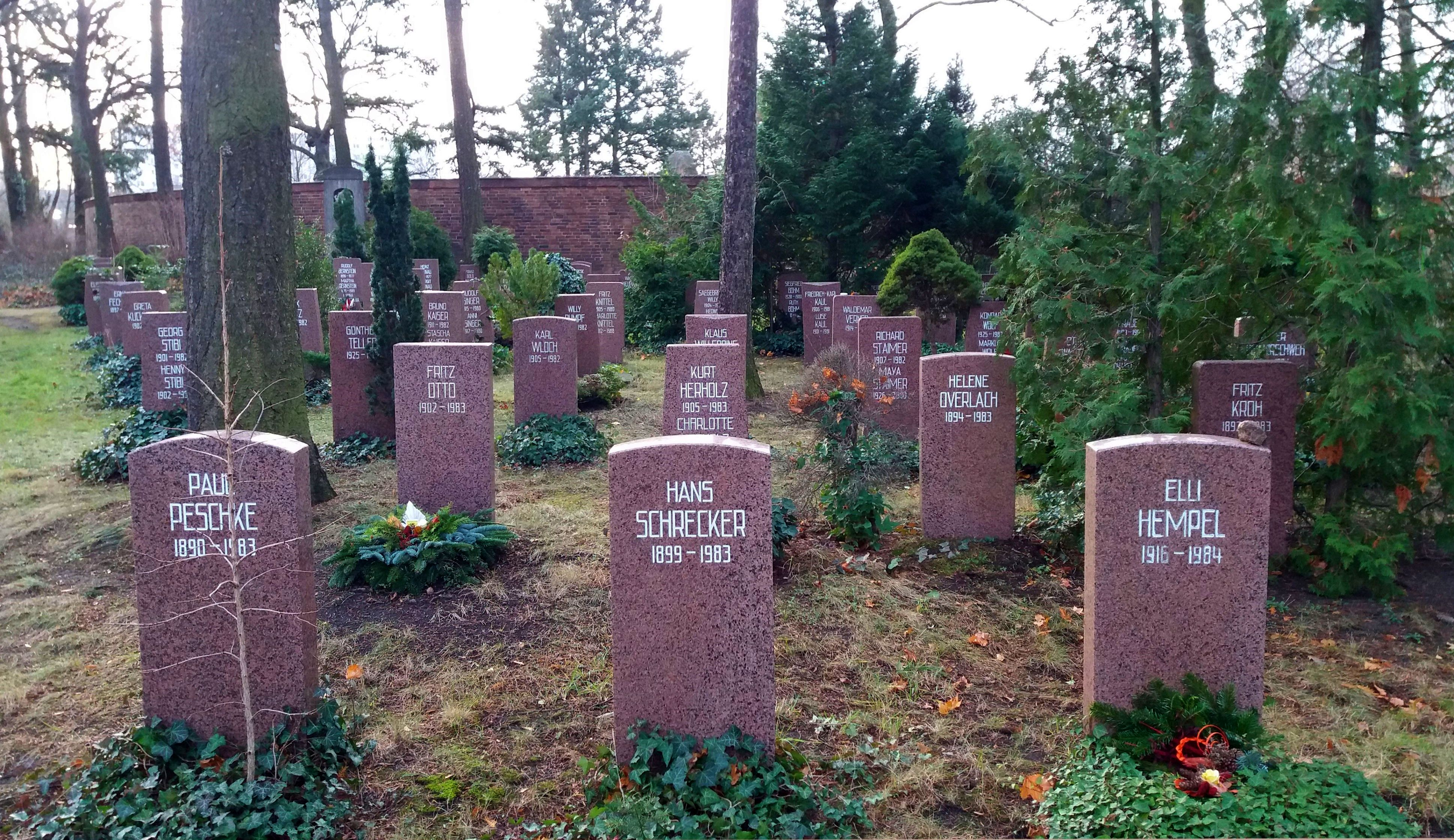
Pergolenweg section

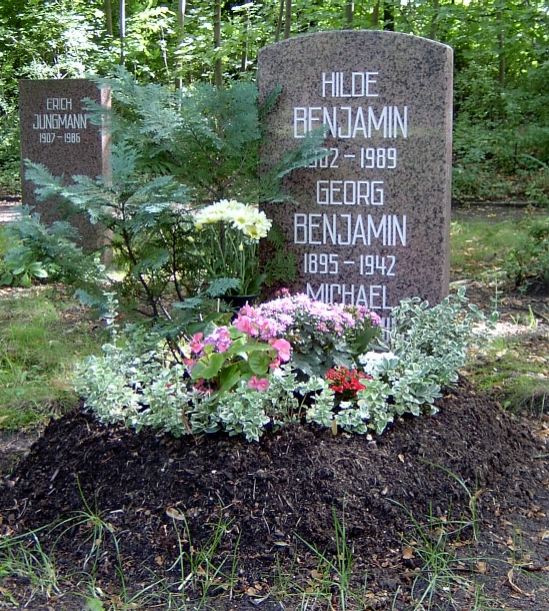
Hilde Benjamin

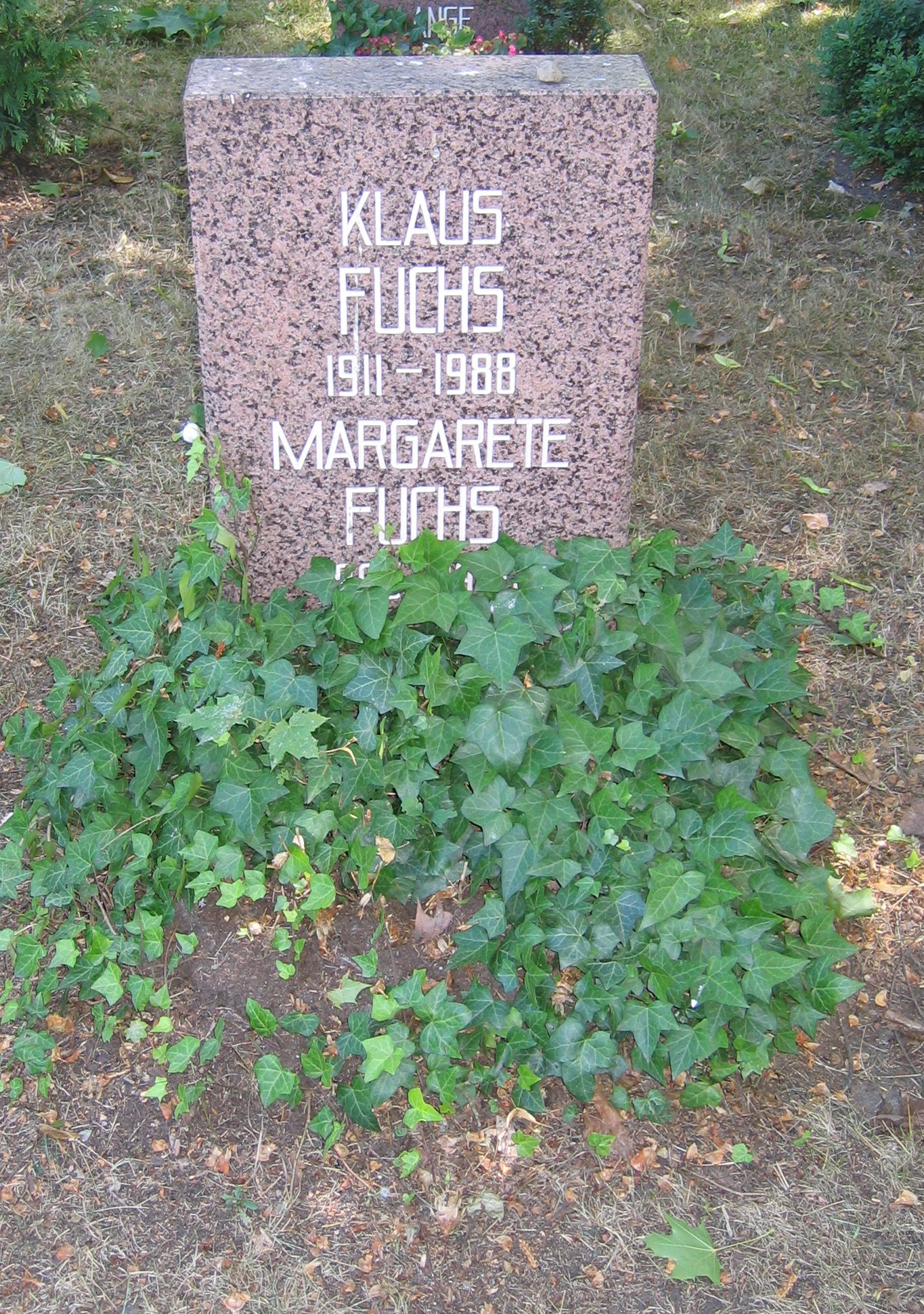
Klaus Fuchs

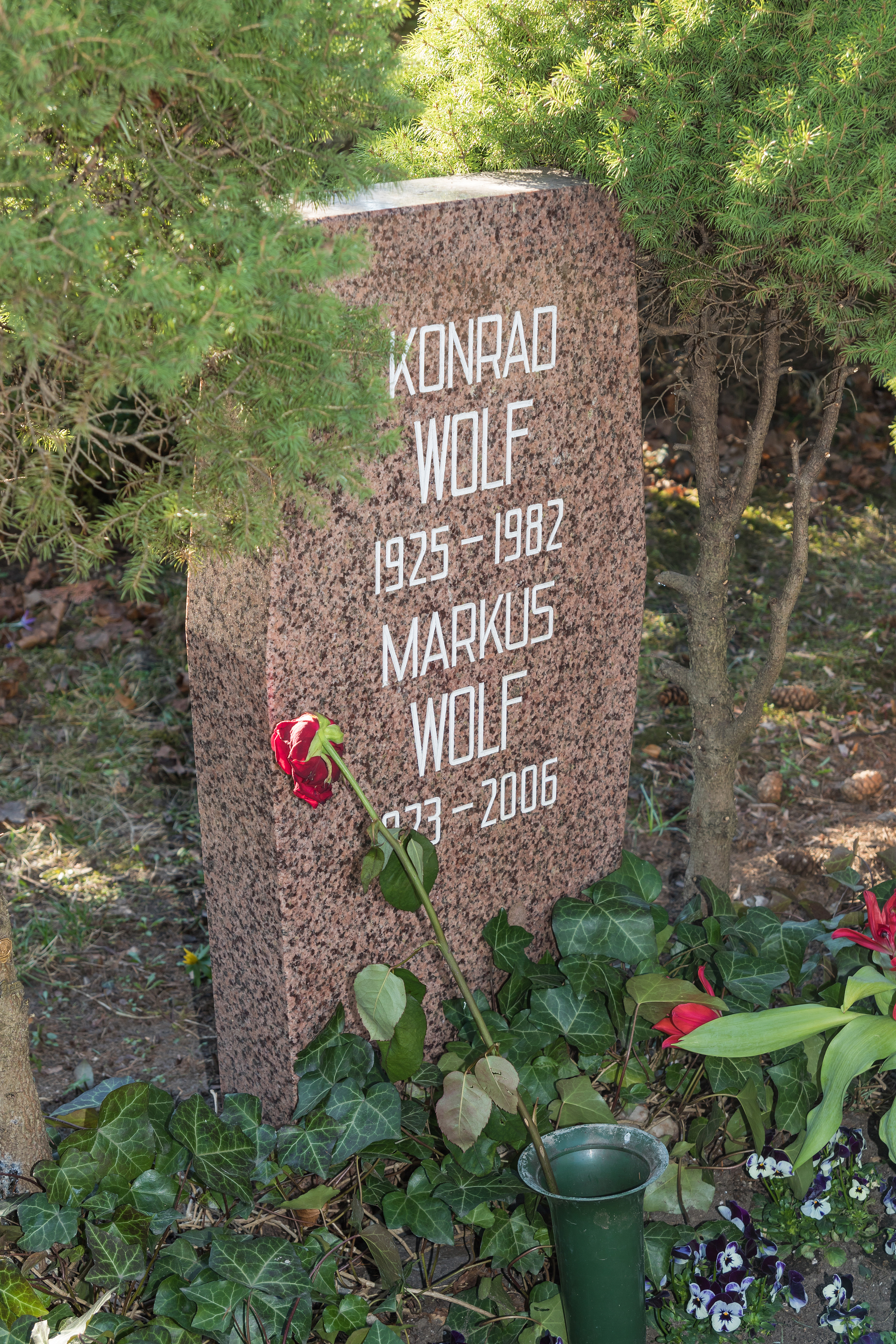
Konrad Wolf
Markus Wolf

=== Other sections of the cemetery ===
- Friedrich Simon Archenhold (1861–1939)
- Käthe Kollwitz (1867–1945)
- Paul Friedrich Meyerheim (1842–1915)
- Erich Mielke (1907–2000)
- Otto Nagel (1894–1967)
- Ludwig Renn (1889–1979)
- F. C. Weiskopf (1900–1955)
- Walter Womacka (1925–2010)
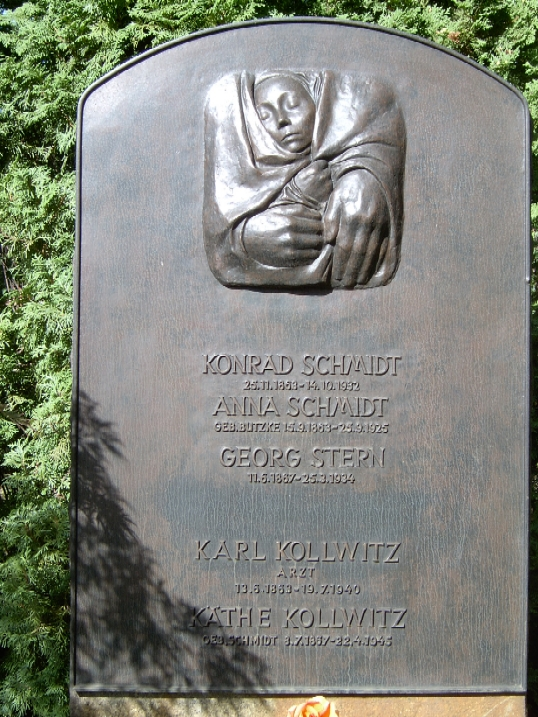
Käthe Kollwitz

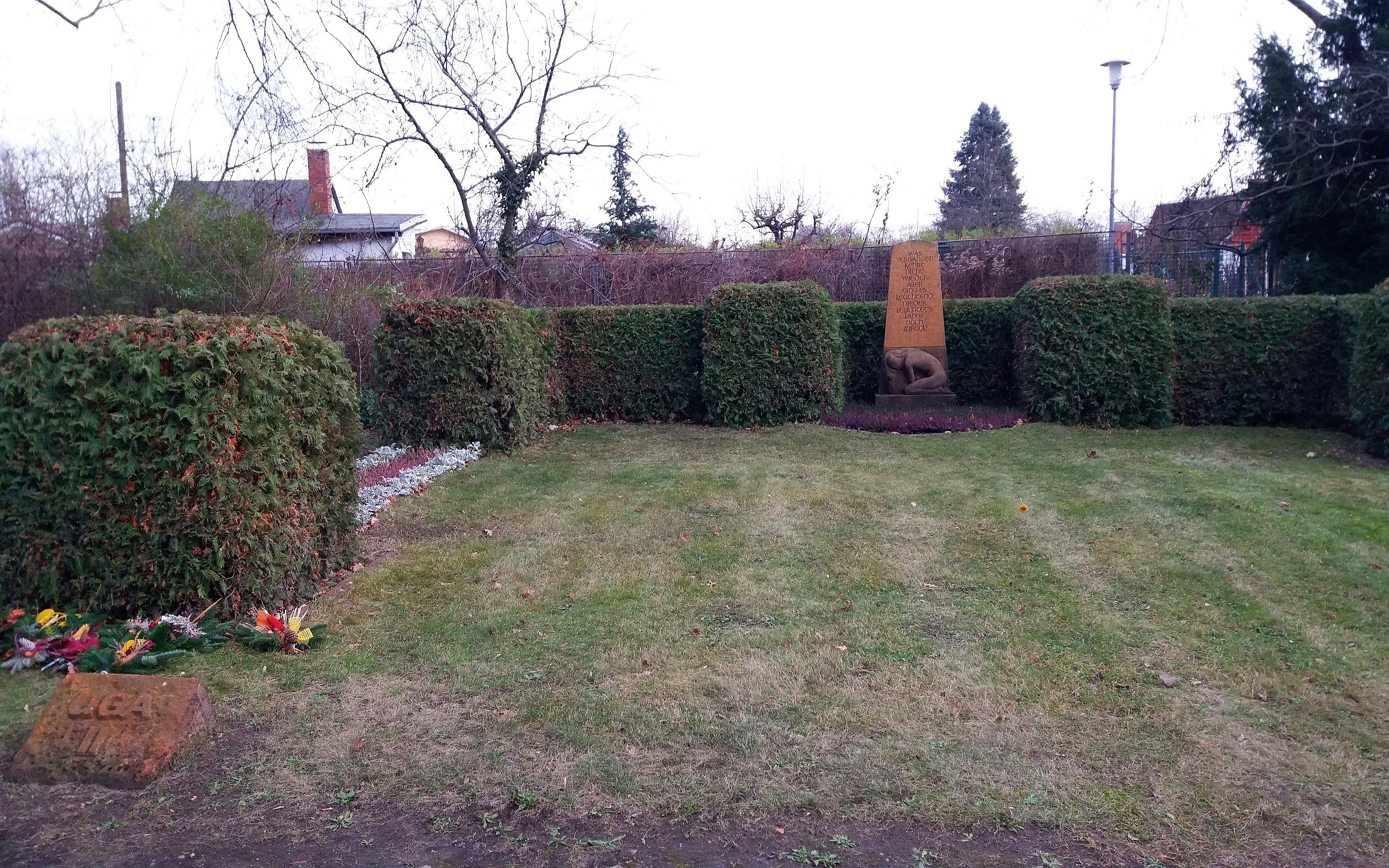
Erich Mielke (anonymous burial in an urn community grave)

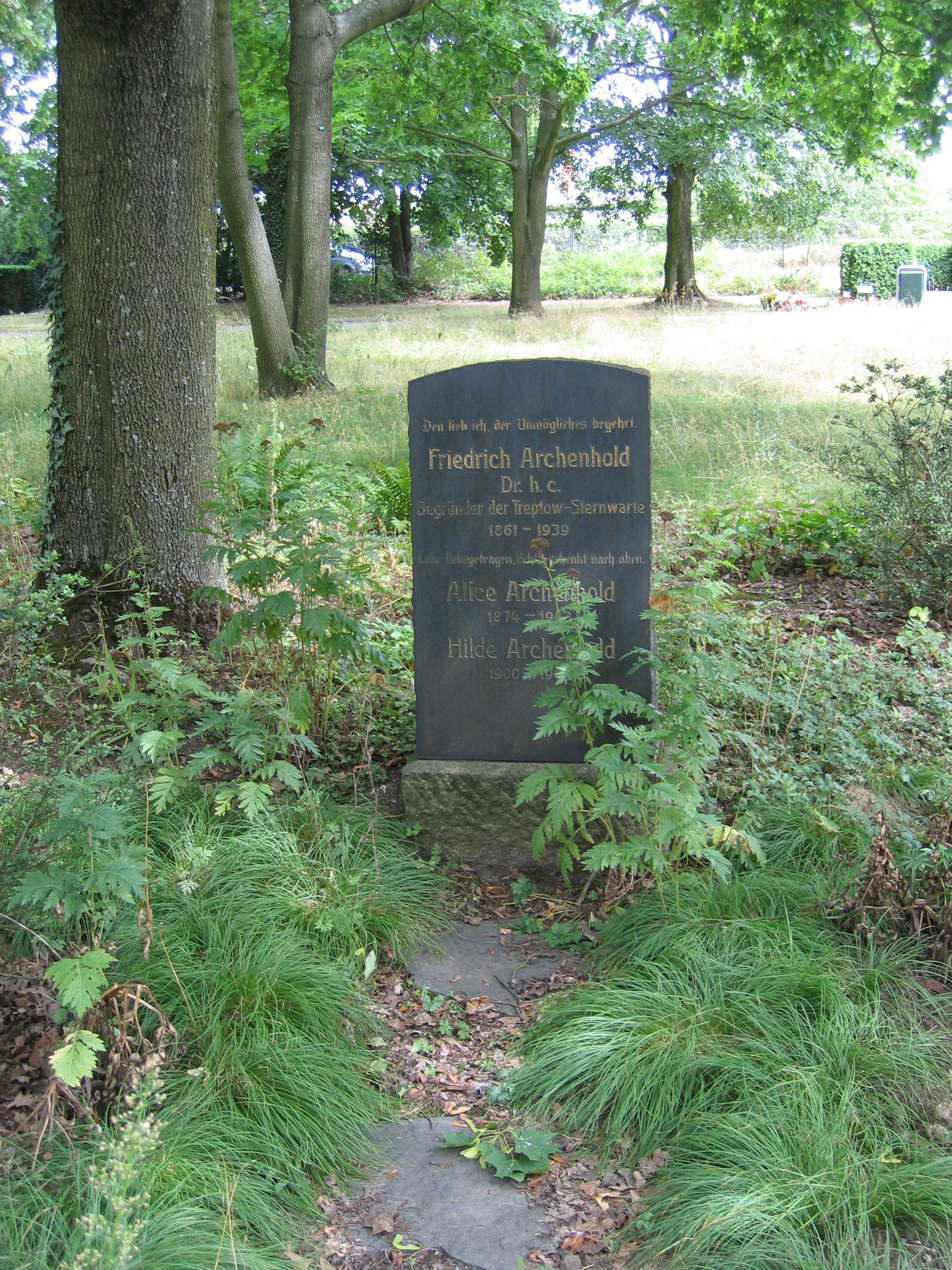
Friedrich Simon Archenhold
