= American espionage in Germany =

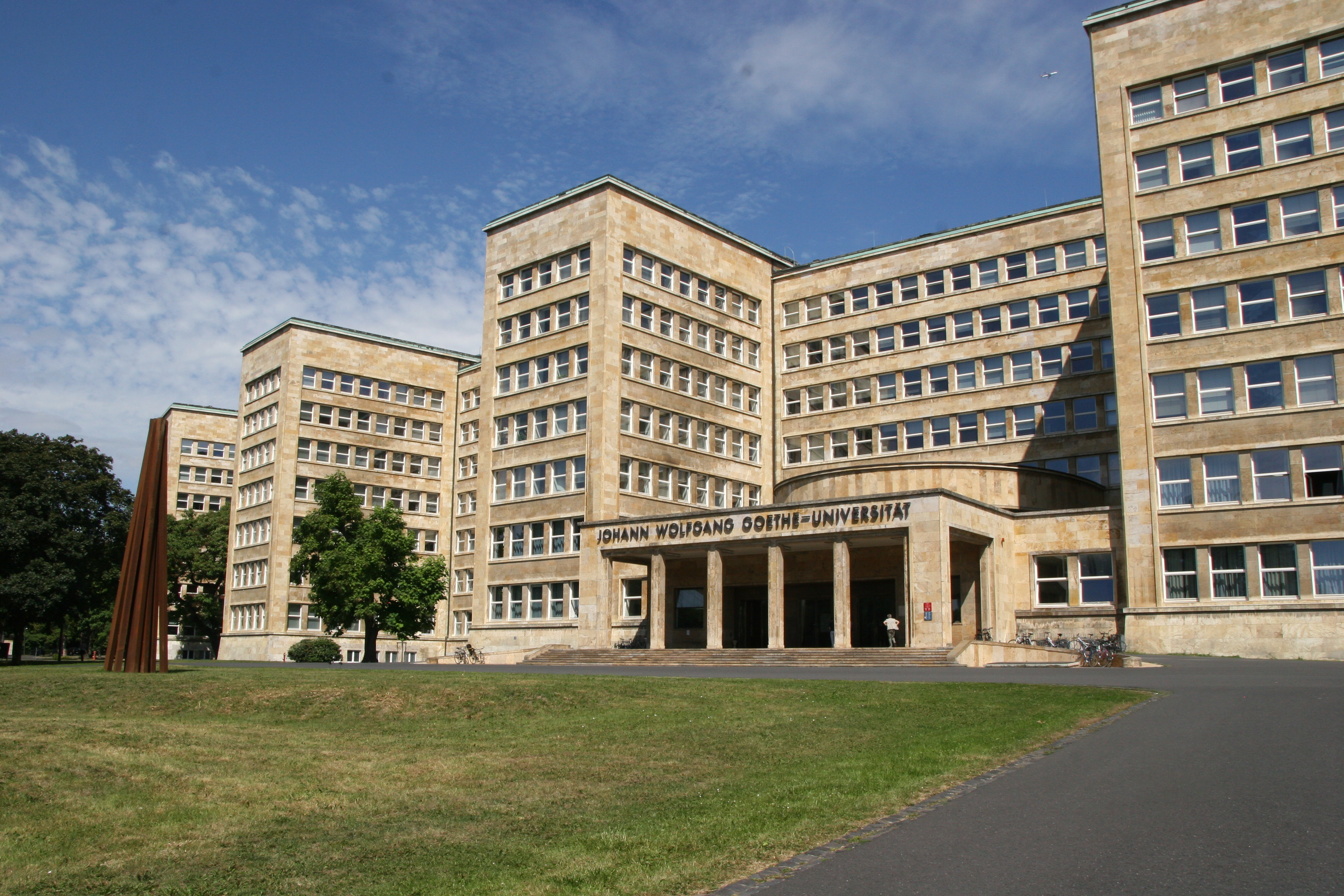
The I.G. Farben building served as the headquarters of the CIA in Germany during the Cold War

American espionage in Germany was significantly intensified during World War II and the following occupation of Germany. As the Iron Curtain ran through the middle of Germany during the Cold War, divided Germany was an important center of US espionage activities. US intelligence monitored the politics of the Federal Republic of Germany as well as conducting espionage and propaganda against the Eastern Bloc. The CIA and other American intelligence services worked closely with the West German BND, which was a close ally of the Americans. Even after German reunification, a significant American intelligence presence in Germany remained. In 2013, the global surveillance and espionage affair revealed that the American NSA had eavesdropped on and spied on almost all top German politicians, including Chancellor Angela Merkel. The revelations also brought to light that the CIA had informants in politics and the security services of Germany.

According to estimates from 2010, around 120 CIA officers were working in Germany, often disguised as diplomats. They were mainly active in the American embassy in Berlin and the consulates in Munich and Frankfurt. For a long time, the CIA headquarters in Frankfurt was located in the I.G. Farben building, which was occupied by the US in World War II. According to revelations by WikiLeaks in 2017, there is a secret hacker unit called Vault 7 in the US consulate in Frankfurt, which is responsible for Europe, the Middle East and Africa. Wiesbaden is home to the US Army's Consolidated Intelligence Center, which was built in 2015 and is said to also be used by the NSA. The espionage center is located near the traffic-intensive DE-CIX internet hub. The US bases in the country are extraterritorial and are therefore subject to US law.

The US has a surveillance capacity on German soil that far exceeds that of the German security services. This is also demonstrated by the fact that numerous terrorist attacks in Germany have been prevented by information from US intelligence. There is therefore a great deal of dependence on the German side in the fight against terrorism.

== History ==
=== World War II ===
Shortly after the Japanese attack on Pearl Harbor, Germany declared war on the US on December 11, 1941. The failure of the US intelligence services at Pearl Harbor led to the establishment of the Office of Strategic Services (OSS) in 1942, which was subordinate to the War Department. Numerous German émigrés worked for the service and passed on information to it, including Herbert Marcuse, Jürgen Kuczynski, Carl Zuckmayer and Franz Neumann. In order to prepare agents for deployment in Germany, the USA even set up a German fake city in Maryland. Almost 20,000 recruits were trained at Camp Ritchie, of whom around 2,000 were born in Germany. Many of them were German Jews, including the later US Secretary of State Henry Kissinger. Thanks to their knowledge of the German language, these recruits were able to provide important services for the American war effort by interrogating German prisoners of war. In cooperation with the British, the Americans were also able to decode German communications (e.g. through the joint Ultra program) and were therefore always well informed about the Wehrmacht 's plans. With Operation Bodyguard, the Allies were able to successfully deceive the Germans about the time and place of their Normandy landings by spreading false information, which contributed to the success of Operation Overlord.

=== Post-war period ===
After the end of the Hitler regime in 1945, Germany was divided into four occupation zones, which were administered by the victorious powers. The priorities of the American services in the immediate post-war period were the denazification and democratization of Germany, the recruitment of German scientists and the monitoring of the activities of the Soviets, with whom relations quickly deteriorated after the victory over the common enemy.

==== Operation Overcast ====
Operation Overcast was a secret US intelligence program in which more than 1,600 German scientists, engineers and technicians were brought from Germany to the US between 1945 and 1959 to work for the American government after the end of the War. The operation was carried out by the Joint Intelligence Objectives Agency (JIOA), which was largely run by special agents from the US Army's Counterintelligence Corps (CIC). The scientists had often been involved in the Nazi rocket program, the air force and German chemical and biological warfare. In some cases, they had been involved in serious war crimes. Among the scientists recruited was Wernher von Braun, who later headed the American space program. German patents were also confiscated by the Americans.

==== Establishment of the Federal Republic ====
The CIC played a decisive role in the denazification of occupied Germany and the arrest of fugitive Nazis. Employees of the military intelligence service checked millions of Germans and were involved in the trials of hundreds of war criminals. The reaction of the population to denazification was also monitored. US intelligence established contacts with trustworthy German politicians. The later German Chancellor Konrad Adenauer was on a whitelist of trustworthy persons, and was contacted by the Americans in 1945. Later President Theodor Heuss owed his rise to his good contacts in US military intelligence circles and possibly acted for a time as an informant for the CIC.

Once political parties were allowed again, they were monitored and infiltrated by US intelligence. The re-established KPD was particularly closely monitored. From 1948 on, Willy Brandt, who supplied the CIC with information from divided Berlin, became the most important SPD informant for the Americans. The US tried to favor the SPD in order to prevent a Communist takeover. Brandt was recruited as an agent in 1950 and, as an "informant 'O-35-VIII'" together with fellow SPD man Hans E. Hirschfeld, received 200,000 German marks in political support from the Americans, who helped his career. His work as an informant ended in 1952, but he remained in contact with US intelligence circles afterwards.

=== Cold war ===
==== Stay-behind-Networks ====
US-Soviet relations soon deteriorated to such an extent that the Cold War started. The Berlin Blockade made the Americans aware of their vulnerable position and, due to the numerical inferiority of US forces in Europe, American military planners assumed that Europe would quickly fall to the Communists in the event of a Soviet attack. The Central Intelligence Agency (CIA), founded under the National Security Act of 1947, therefore began to set up so-called stay-behind networks, which would act in the interests of the Americans behind enemy lines in the event of a Soviet attack. Numerous former Nazis were recruited in Germany for this project. Between 1948 and 1955, the CIA organized more than a dozen such networks in West Germany and West Berlin, consisting of several hundred German radio operators, agents and informants, many of whom had been soldiers in the Wehrmacht or the Waffen SS during World War II. As part of the operation, secret depots were set up with weapons, explosives, radio and cipher documents and supplies. These networks of secret weapons depots and agents were set up not only in Germany, but also in numerous other NATO countries.

==== Rivalry with the Soviets in Berlin ====
The divided German capital Berlin became a center of espionage as early as the 1940s. Here, the Americans were closest to the emerging Eastern Bloc and the Soviet armed forces and all intelligence services recruited among the population of Berlin. In cooperation with the British, the CIA pulled off an intelligence coup in 1955 with Operation Gold, when they built a 400-meter-long spy tunnel between the American and Soviet sectors, with which Soviet telephone lines could be tapped and intercepted. However, the Soviets had already been well-informed about the tunnel in advance thanks to Soviet spies in the British MI5, and they blew the whistle on the operation a year later without jeopardizing their source.

In 1959, there were over a thousand American spies in the city of Berlin. The presence of Western spies in Berlin was one of the reasons why the Soviets supported the construction of the Berlin Wall, which cut off contact with many Western intelligence sources in East Berlin.

==== American intelligence activities in Cold War Germany ====
West Germany was of great importance as a base for US intelligence activities. Along with Turkey and the United Kingdom, Germany was one of the three countries that allowed a large number and variety of different intelligence stations and bases on its territory, while other European countries restricted them. Numerous SIGINT listening posts, radar surveillance stations and CIA bases were established in Germany, which played an important role in the Cold War for the Americans. The CIA's German Station was the largest CIA unit overseas. In 1959, it had between 1,400 and 1,700 operational and support personnel. The CIA German headquarters, which occupied parts of a huge former IG Farben building in Frankfurt, controlled a dozen operational bases scattered throughout West Germany, the largest of which was the 200-person Berlin Operations Base (BOB), whose code name was the U.S. Army Field Systems Office. The BOB was located in a three-story building in Berlin's Dahlem district, which had been the headquarters of the German Air Force during World War II. The CIA also controlled numerous smaller weapons depots, spy stations, training camps, ammunition depots and secret hiding places throughout West Germany.

Even after the Federal Republic had achieved foreign policy sovereignty, the victorious powers retained privileges to protect their security, some of which were suspended by the German Basic Law, in particular the secrecy of correspondence, post and telecommunications. The German Federal Post was monitored for communist activities. During the Cold War, Western intelligence services intercepted around 90 million items of mail. The German telephone network was also monitored by the NSA.

There were a number of CIA-sponsored psychological warfare operations carried out from Germany. For example, balloons with anti-Soviet messages were flown eastwards over the inner-German border until the 1960s. The propaganda stations Radio Free Europe / Radio Liberty, which were financed and managed by the CIA from 1948 until the 1970s, broadcast from Munich. The USA also tried to influence German mass media. The publishing house Axel Springer is said to have received 7 million US dollars in the 1950s for reporting that was in line with US interests. American intelligence services financed various anti-communist groups such as the Bund Deutscher Jugend, the Untersuchungsausschuß Freiheitlicher Juristen and the Kampfgruppe gegen Unmenschlichkeit. More than a dozen organizations received funds from the CIA in the mid-1950s, including publishing houses and the political opposition in East Germany. The CIA also financed numerous art and cultural magazines in Europe and promoted abstract expressionism over socialist realism as an art form.

The USA also tried to set up a spy network in the GDR, but found it difficult to do so. The efforts failed in particular due to the determined counterintelligence of the Stasi and the KGB as well as the lack of coordination between the numerous American intelligence agencies. The Cambridge Five also caused a considerable security leak from within, which led to a number of agents in the East being exposed. However, some spies remained undetected for longer, such as the spy Gertrud Liebing, who spied on the Central Committee of the SED for the CIA for eleven years from 1954 before she was caught in 1966. The USA also tried to obtain information about the GDR via spy flights and the interrogation of East German refugees to West Germany. However, the most important source for the Americans about events in the GDR remained the West German BND.

=== After German reunification ===
In the immediate aftermath of the fall of the Berlin Wall, the USA obtained the Rosenholz files, a list of Stasi employees who helped the US to expose spies, by unknown means. The files were allegedly sold to the CIA by a KGB employee for 75,000 US dollars. The files were analyzed by US intelligence and only returned to Germany in incomplete form in 2003.

On April 22, 1991, Jeffrey Carney was kidnapped by the US in Berlin in an illegal operation on German soil. Carney had been the highest-ranking US defector in Germany and had fled to East Germany in 1985, having previously betrayed secrets to the Stasi. He was sentenced to 38 years in prison in the US and was pardoned in 2003.

With the end of the Cold War, the presence of American intelligence services was scaled back and intelligence personnel in Western Europe were reduced by around half. An end to the surveillance of the German telephone and postal network was agreed to with the Germans, although the Americans did not adhere to this in the period that followed. In 1995, US President Bill Clinton is said to have instructed the CIA to step up economic espionage against friendly countries such as Japan and Germany. During the UN inspections of the facilities operated by Ba’athist Iraq, the CIA is said to have stolen secrets from the German nuclear industry.

The terrorist attacks on September 11, 2001 and the subsequent wars in Afghanistan and Iraq increased Germany's importance for the Americans once again. The US military bases in Germany, such as Ramstein Air Base, played an important role in the war on terror. During the war on terror, the establishment of the black sites is alleged to have been planned and coordinated from the CIA base in Frankfurt. Captured terror suspects were imprisoned and tortured at the black sites.

Gerhard Schröder's refusal to join the coalition of the willing caused mistrust among the Americans. As a result, he was put on the NSA's list of people to be monitored from 2002 and his phone calls were tapped.

In 2007, the terrorist Sauerland cell was exposed through phone calls and emails intercepted by the NSA. The terrorists had planned attacks on US military facilities in Germany. Even before the later leaks, the interception revealed the NSA's great capacity for monitoring communication systems inside Germany.

The revelations by whistleblower Edward Snowden in the summer of 2013 revealed that the NSA had monitored and tapped the cell phones and telephones of 35 heads of state worldwide, including the communications of German Chancellor Angela Merkel. The latter expressed its outrage and the German government summoned the US ambassador for the first time. The NSA affair also revealed unprecedented mass surveillance of German citizens by US intelligence agencies. After the US had promised to stop monitoring the German Chancellor, a US intelligence official confirmed in 2014 that the cell phone of Interior Minister Thomas de Maizière would now be monitored instead, according to reports from Bild. At that time, the NSA was directly monitoring over 300 people in Germany, including business and political leaders. The spying program to monitor the German political and business elite is said to have begun as early as 1998.

Later, the German NSA investigative committee was also spied on by the US when an BND employee, who had been spying for the CIA since 2012, handed over secret documents of the investigative committee to the Americans. In the case that Edward Snowden would be summoned to appear before the committee of inquiry, the USA has threatened to stop cooperating with German intelligence services and counter-terrorism efforts.

According to revelations from June 2014, the US had placed a dozen spies in various German ministries, including the ministries of defense, economy, interior and foreign aid. The latter was of interest to the CIA because the BND ran covert operations abroad via the Federal Ministry for Economic Cooperation and Development.

A document made public by the Pentagon leaks of 2023 suggests that the US intelligence services can still read communications from the German Ministry of Defense. The authenticity of the documents is unconfirmed, but they have been classified as authentic by Die Zeit and ARD.

== Cooperation between the BND and American intelligence agencies ==
The BND emerged from the Gehlen organization, which was founded under the aegis of the Americans. Former Wehrmacht Major General Reinhard Gehlen, became the leader of the organization and later the first president of the BND, which was founded in 1956 as successor. Numerous Nazi officers were among the early employees who were now recruited by the Americans against the Soviets. Throughout the Cold War, the American intelligence services and the BND were close allies. One successful joint collaboration was Operation Rubicon, in which almost 100 countries were spied on from 1970 onwards through the sale of manipulated encryption technology (CX-52) from the Swiss company Crypto AG.

According to media reports, the BND, the BKA and the BfV are said to have cooperated with the CIA in setting up secret prisons (black sites). Germans are also said to have been involved in interrogations in Guantanamo Bay detention camp.

The BND is said to have cooperated with the NSA in spying on German citizens in Project 6 and other operations, which led to public criticism of the service. The BND forwarded data such as private cell phone numbers and email addresses to the NSA and pre-sorted data for the NSA. In response to the affair, the German Bundestag passed a revised BND law in October 2016.

== Literature ==
- Boghardt, Thomas (2023). Covert Legions - U.S. Army Intelligence in Germany, 1944-1949 (PDF). U.S. Army Center of Military History. ISBN 978-3110999259.
