= Johann Burianek =

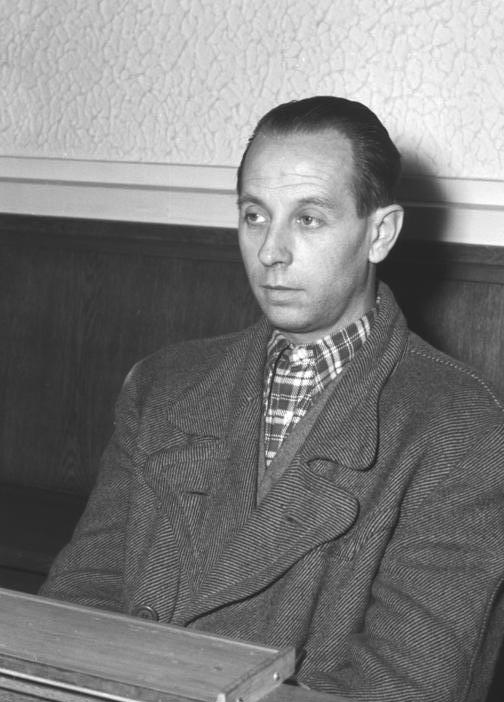
- Burianek in the dock at the High Court in Berlin (23 May 1952)
- Born: 16 November 1913; Düsseldorf, North Rhine-Westphalia, German Empire
- Died: 2 August 1952 (aged 38); Münchner Platz Prison, Dresden, East Germany

Johann Burianek (16 November 1913 – 2 August 1952) was a German anti-communist resistance fighter. He planned and carried out several acts of sabotage against the German Democratic Republic and was a member of the anti-communist resistance group KGU.

In a 1952 show trial he was sentenced to death in the country's Supreme Court for preparing attacks on railway bridges. He was the first person to receive a death sentence from the new country's justice system. His conviction was posthumously overturned in 2005.

== Life ==
=== Early years ===
Burianek was born in the Rheinland at Düsseldorf, the son of a master shoe maker. He underwent an apprenticeship as a machinist and in 1932 relocated to Czechoslovakia, taking Czechoslovak nationality in 1932/33. He served in the Luftwaffe during the 1930s and in 1939 took back his German nationality.

=== World War II ===
During the Second World War, Burianek served in the Wehrmacht. In the final days of the war, Burianek arrested Herbert Kloster, a deserter whom he then delivered to his military headquarters. Kloster was nearly executed as a result of Burianek's actions. In November 1949, an East German court found Burianek guilty for reporting the deserter and sentenced him to one year in prison.

=== Insurgent activities ===
Burianek was released on probation in April 1950, having served nearly half his sentence. He found work as a truck driver with the Volkseigener Betrieb (publicly owned business) Secura-Mechanik. Between July 1950 and March 1951 he smuggled several thousand copies of the western newsheets Kleiner Telegraf and Tarantel into the Soviet sector of Berlin. In March 1951 he joined the anti-communist resistance group "Struggle against Inhumanity" group (KgU / Kampfgruppe gegen Unmenschlichkeit) which was then being established by Rainer Hildebrandt with backing from the Americans. His attacks on the part of the KgU included numerous acts of sabotage and unsuccessful arson attacks on the 1951 World Festival of Youth and Students.

His most ambitious project, planned for 21 February 1952, would have involved blowing up a civilian railway bridge at Erkner, on the south-eastern edge of Berlin, which would have de-railed the "Blue Express", the long-distance train running between Berlin and Moscow via Warsaw. Despite knowing this might cause civilian casualties, Burianek proceeded with the plot. The necessary explosives would be provided by the KgU. However, the project failed to progress beyond the planning stage, as it proved impossible to get hold of a suitable truck to carry the explosives. On 5 March 1952, Burianek was arrested.

=== Trial and execution ===
Some ten weeks later, on 15 May 1952, Burianek was tried in a show trial before the Supreme Court. The presiding judge was Hilde Benjamin, the court's vice-president. Burianek was accused and found to be an agent of the KgU.

The court delivered its verdict on 25 May 1952, and Johann Burianek became the first defendant in the German Democratic Republic to receive a death sentence. Two months after receiving his sentence, Burianek was executed by guillotine.

== Rehabilitation by the Berlin regional court ==
In 2005 Johann Burianek's conviction was found to have been unconstitutional, because of "serious disregard for basic rules [of justice]" in the original trial. The 1952 verdict was reversed. This reversal arose from an initiative by the "Arbeitsgemeinschaft 13. August" organisation which had been established, like the KgU before it, by Rainer Hildebrandt, and which now successfully applied to the Berlin District Court to have the 1992 Criminal Rehabilitation Act invoked for the Burianek case. In a judgement delivered on 2 September 2005, the court also held that between his arrest on 5 March 1952 and his execution on 2 August 1952 Johann Burianek had been unlawfully deprived of his freedom.

== Legacy ==
In Germany, under §189 of the criminal code, defamation of the memory of a deceased person is a criminal offence which upon conviction may attract a fine or a prison term of up to two years. The Burianek case hit the headlines again in 2012 and 2013 on account of a former Stasi officer, Colonel Wolfgang Schmidt, who used his internet site to describe Burianek as a "bandit" and as the "leader of a terrorist organisation". On 27 September 2012 Schmidt was convicted under §189 in respect of the matter by a court which evidently accepted that Schmidt's characterizations of Burianek had been false and defamatory. The court ordered Schmidt to pay a fine of €1,200.

The action against Schmidt had been triggered by Hubertus Knabe, the director of the Hohenschönhausen Memorial Museum on the northern edge of Berlin. It was not the first time Knabe and Schmidt had come across one another, Schmidt already having been fined €2,100 in 2009 for calling Knabe himself a "publicly unrestrained rabble rouser" ("öffentlich und ungestraft als Volksverhetzer") in connection with Knabe's earlier work on the Stasi.

Schmidt appealed against the €1,200 fine, imposed under §189 for defaming the memory of Johann Burianek, but on 18 March 2013 the District Court rejected his appeal. Knabe welcomed the court's verdict: "I am pleased that the Justice System stands up against historical revisionism from former Stasi operatives. Even today, we must not allow the perpetrators to denigrate their victims in public." He also stressed the significance of a court decision which, for the first time, extended §189 of the Criminal code to include negative portrayals of those convicted by the German Democratic Republic.
