= Ernst Tillich =

German theologian (1910–1985)

- Born: 27 June 1910; Marienwerder, West Prussia, Germany
- Died: 16 March 1985 (aged 74); Düsseldorf, North Rhine-Westphalia, West Germany
- Occupations: Theologian; Anti-dictatorship activist
- Spouse: Anita Walter/Tillich 1951
- Children: 4
- Parent(s): Franz Tillich _____ von Richthofen

Ernst Tillich (27 June 1910 – 16 March 1985) was a German theologian.

He survived the twelve Nazi years, but nevertheless spent much of the period in state detention, including more than three years in the concentration camp at Sachsenhausen. Subsequently, between 1951 and 1958, Tillich led the Kampfgruppe gegen Unmenschlichkeit (KgU "Combat Group against Inhumanity"), a US funded militant campaigning anti-communist organisation, based in West Berlin, which supported resistance to the one-party dictatorship that had established itself as the German Democratic Republic in October 1949.

== Life ==
Tillich was born in Marienwerder, a midsized country town then in West Prussia. His father, Dr. Franz Tillich, was a magistrate. A close relative, Paul Tillich, achieved eminence as a philosopher. Tillich successfully completed his schooling at the Steglitz "Grammar School" ("Gymnasium") on the south side of Berlin and went on to study Theology at universities in Berlin, Bonn and Tübingen.

After the first stage of his theology exams he became an assistant, and later a vicar, in a Community of the Confessing Church at Kleinmachnow, on the edge of Berlin. During his time at university he joined one of Dietrich Bonhoeffer's student groups. He took part in the Ecumenical Youth Conference of the World Alliance for International Church Friendship which was held on the island of Fanø in 1934. Soon after this, however, he found himself obliged to leave ecclesiastical service because of his "immoral lifestyle".

In October 1936 the Gestapo arrested Tillich. A month later they arrested his friend the Evangelical pastor, Werner Koch. The two were suspected of providing the foreign press prematurely with extracts of draft memoranda addressed to Hitler from the Confessing Church. Two decades later the East German propaganda machine would describe Tillich's activity as "trading in news" ("nachrichtenhändlerische" Tätigkeiten) with foreign news services such as UPI, Reuters and the Paris headquartered Havas organisation. He was locked away for more than three years, initially in solitary confinement in the Gestapo prison at Berlin's Alexander-Platz, and then at the Sachsenhausen concentration camp. He was released in 1939 and sent to work for Siemens & Halske: he remained with Siemens till he was conscripted for military service early in 1942, and spent the rest of the war as a soldier in Belgium and The Netherlands.

War, which for Germany had broken out in September 1939, ended in May 1945. Frontiers had changed and what remained of Germany was divided into military occupation zones, allocated between principal militarily victorious states. The part of East Prussia where Tillich had been born had been subjected to sustained ethnic cleansing and was now part of Poland, while Berlin was at the centre of a Soviet occupation zone. Instead of returning to Berlin, Ernst Tillich settled in Bavaria, in the US occupation zone, becoming a Youth Officer in Fürstenfeldbruck near Munich, and later becoming chairman of the district council. A year later he returned to Berlin, becoming active in the field of social policy and joining the editorial board of "Das sozialistische Jahrhundert" ("The Socialist Century"), a newly launched fortnightly political magazine controlled by Otto Suhr between 1946 and 1950.

In March 1950 Ernst Tillich joined the leadership team of the West Berlin based Kampfgruppe gegen Unmenschlichkeit (KgU "Combat Group against Inhumanity"). Other KgU leaders included Rainer Hildebrandt, Ernst Benda, Günther Birkenfeld, Herbert Geissler, Peter Lorenz and Albrecht Tietze. One source states that Rainer Hildebrandt, a KgU founder, had been instructed by the group's US secret service sponsors to recruit Tillich as the group's political advisor . He became its leader in 1951. Early on the group had gained a reputation, which East German propaganda encouraged, for hatching blood curling plots to blow up bridges and prisons, which somehow never came to fruition, but which nevertheless generated a succession of idealistic, often very young, conspirators who could be pilloried in high-profile show trials and then locked up or executed. Truth is hard to disinter from politically motivated exaggeration, but it seems that as KgU leader Tillich initially tried to lead the group away from an agenda of amateurish thwarted bomb plots towards a Gandiesque passive resistance strategy. However, it is not clear that he found his fellow KgU members particularly biddable, and there are suggestions that, in a context of internal rivalries among its leaders, Tillich became little more than a figurehead chief of the KgU, while by 1958 the increasingly serious nature of Cold War east:west confrontation left the group's modus operandi looking increasingly outdated to the US intelligence agencies who had enthusiastically encouraged and funded it earlier during the 1950s.

Ernst Tillich resigned from leadership of the KgU in the summer of 1958, and resigned his membership of it on 12 March 1959. The organisation was effectively dissolved at approximately the same time. Tillich himself was no longer politically active in public after this, but concentrated on his work which was in the hospitals sector.
