= Werner Koch (pastor) =

- Born: 26 December 1910; Bielefeld, Westphalia, Prussia, Germany
- Died: 31 July 1994 (aged 83); Emlichheim, Lower Saxony, West Germany
- Education: Marburg; Tübingen; Paris; Bonn
- Occupations: Theologian, pastor (lutheran-evangelical) journalist & press intermediary
- Known for: anti-government resistance
- Spouse: Gerritdina Stokmann
- Parent: Maximilian Koch

Werner Koch (26 December 1910 – 31 July 1994) was a German pastor, evangelical-reformed theologian and journalist. Through his early involvement with the Confessing Church ("Bekennende Kirche") he came to wider prominence as an opponent of the Nazi government, spending time in Sachsenhausen concentration camp.

== Biography ==
=== Early years ===
Werner Koch was born in Bielefeld. On leaving school he moved on to study Lutheran Theology at Marburg, Tübingen, Paris and finally (and most intensively) Bonn. At Bonn he formed a firm friendship with his professor, the influential scholar-theologian Karl Barth. He was still an undergraduate student in July 1931 when he first met Dietrich Bonhoeffer. Like Barth and Bonhoeffer, Werner Koch was hugely critical of the political developments in Germany during the early 1930s. After several years of intensifying political polarisation and parliamentary paralysis, the Nazis took power in January 1933 and moved quickly to transform Germany into a one-party dictatorship.

=== Confessing church ===
After passing Part I of his Theology Exams, Koch embarked on his "Vikariat" (probationary period as a trainee church minister) in 1934, while still in Bonn. Early in 1935 he began to write reports covering developments and struggles involving the Confessing Church ("Bekennende Kirche"), which can be seen as a movement within German Protestantism that arose during the Nazi years in opposition to government-sponsored efforts to unify all Protestant churches into a single pro-Nazi Protestant Reich Church. He supplied his reports, under a pseudonym, to newspapers in Switzerland and Britain.

Dietrich Bonhoeffer had by now become a leading figure in the Confessing Church. In October 1935 news reached Koch, who was still in Bonn, of a forthcoming "Confessing Church Ministers' Seminar" (course) to be conducted by Bonhoeffer at Finkenwalde (on the edge of Stettin) during the winter of 1935/36. Koch broke off his studies and moved to Finkenwalde where he attended the (illegal) seminar and resumed his ministerial training, now as a trainee for the Confessing Church. He now met Dietrich Bonhoeffer for the second time. There were excellent transport links with the capital and his weekend visits to Berlin were frequent. Koch evidently had a talent for reporting, and Bonhoeffer encouraged him in his journalistic activities. In Berlin during the autumn of 1935 he established contact with international press agencies such as Reuters. He also found himself much in demand among senior diplomatic correspondents posted to Berlin, increasingly deprived of reliable information on what was happening in Germany through more conventional channels. He was able to provide accurate reportage from the inside on the increasingly intense struggles within the Protestant churches between those content to operate as a state mandated institution and the Confessing Church faction who were not. The 25-year-old Koch's regular briefings to the foreign press were both illegal and, from the point of view of the authorities, unwelcome. Meanwhile, he also found time to pursue his "Vikariat", now based in Wuppertal-Barmen.

The most powerful section of the leaked memorandum is that in which the Confessing Church theologians address Nazi race philosophy, and in a few brief sentences condemn it:

"Wenn hier Blut, Rasse, Volkstum und Ehre den Rang von Ewigkeitswerten erhalten, so wird der evangelische Christ durch das 1. Gebot gezwungen, diese Bewertung abzulehnen. [.."Du sollst keine anderen Götter neben mir haben"...] Wenn der arische Mensch verherrlicht wird, so bezeugt Gottes Wort die Sündhaftigkeit aller Menschen. Wenn den Christen im Rahmen der nationalsozialistischen Weltanschauung ein Antisemitismus aufgedrängt wird, der zum Judenhaß verpflichtet, so steht für ihn dagegen das christliche Gebot der Nächstenliebe."

If blood, ethnicity, race and honour are ranked as eternal values, so the Evangelical Christian is compelled by the First Commandment, to reject that evaluation. [..."You shall have no other God but me"...] Wherever Aryan humanity is glorified, testimony is provided in support of God's Word than all men [and women] are sinners. If – in the context of the National Socialist world vision – an anti-Semitism is imposed which obliges the individual to hatred of Jews as an article of civic duty, then for the individual Christian that stands in opposition to the Christian commandment, "love thy neighbour".

Koch received support and encouragement for his journalistic work from his friend Ernst Tillich. Tillich was himself engaged in briefing foreign journalists on the church struggles, but he also had his own problems with the church, and Tillich reduced his own reporting as Koch moved centre stage with the foreign pressmen during 1936. Werner Koch was arrested on the morning of Friday 13 November 1936. and taken, in the first instance, to Düsseldorf. His ordination, scheduled for Sunday, had to be deferred. Friedrich Weißler, a leader in the Confessing Church also prominent for his involvement in Christian resistance against National Socialism, as well as Ernst Tillich, had been arrested the previous month. All three were suspected in connection with the release to foreign media of a memorandum addressed to Adolf Hitler, delivered to the Chancellor on 4 June 1936 (without evoking any reaction), and which the Confessing Church had planned to have read out in pulpits on 23 August 1936. The text of a version of the memorandum was published in the foreign press in July 1936, during the build-up to the Olympic Games. First it appeared in the London-based The Morning Post on 17 July and then, on 23 July, in the Basler Nachrichten. It never did become entirely clear how the leak to the foreign media had occurred, and it was only several months later, in the Autumn, that the Gestapo determined that Koch had been involved.

=== Concentration camp ===
Koch was transferred to the Sachsenhausen concentration camp on 13 February 1937, together with around a dozen others, including Weißler and Tillich . Paperwork accompanying the three men identified Friedrich Weißler as Jewish, and when they reached the camp he was separated from the "Aryan" detainees. Friedrich Weißler died at Sachsenhausenon 19 February 1937 as a result of the torture to which he had been subjected.

For Werner Koch, release from the concentration camp came unexpectedly on 2 December 1938 as the result of what one source describes as a "whim of Himmler's". The background was less whimsical. Koch's father had persuaded a friend, Baron Kurt von Schertel, to intervene with Himmler on his son's behalf. Himmler had been invited as a guest of von Schertel to a private dinner party which he held on 1 December 1938 at the elegant resort of Wiesbaden. Late in the evening the host ventured to ask Himmler to arrange for the release from the concentration camp of the youngest son of his friend, Maximilian Koch. The father had taken the further precaution of preparing a detailed account of his son's arrest, which was handed to Himmler. Himmler evidently read the note, and later that same evening ordered his minions to set in motion the necessary arrangements.

=== War years ===
Until his conscription in November 1939 Koch now worked for the Evangelical Press Association for the Rhineland. In July 1939 he married Gerritdina Stokmann whose family came from the north-west of the country, close to the Dutch border. His first assignment after he had been conscripted involved work as an overseer and simultaneous translator in Emsland, working with French-speaking prisoners of war. In the summer of 1942 he was redeployed to the Eastern Front as a member of a punishment battalion. He was soon wounded and returned to the west where early in 1943 he was assigned to a battalion of French Prisoners of war at Mülheim an der Ruhr employed, as before, as a simultaneous translator. By March 1945 it was apparent that the war would soon end and that Germany was on the losing side. Werner Koch deserted from the army and, in the words of one admiring student to whom Koch taught "religious studies" during the 1980s, "fled to the English". Other sources state that he handed himself over to American forces, but it was in any event as a British prisoner of War that he spent the next couple of years.

=== Postwar years ===
Immediately after the war ended, in May 1945, The British created a prisoner of war camp at Ascot Racecourse adapted, it seems, from a training facility that had been made available to Free French forces during the years of fighting. According to at least one source the Ascot camp was set aside for those German prisoners of war who had been identified as opponents of National Socialism. It was here that Werner Koch served as a camp pastor during 1945/46. During this time he was able to resume his activity as a journalist. He also undertook work for "London Broadcasting" ("Londoner Rundfunk" – presumably the BBC).

Koch published an autobiography in 1982. However, the focus of the book is on his time as an anti-Nazi activist, and there is relatively little information available on his later years. In 1946 or 1947 he was appointed a pastor in the Wedding quarter of Berlin, then in the French sector of the city and, after 1949, part of West Berlin. He moved briefly back to Bielefeld in 1952/53 and then took a pastoral appointment at Espelkamp, a short distance further north. He moved again in 1958, this time to nearby Netphen, where he served till 1969. In 1969 he moved with his wife to the County of Bentheim, in the extreme northwest of West Germany, settling in Emlichheim which was where his wife had been born. Although he still undertook a certain amount of journalism, the principle focus of his semi-retirement was on religious teaching. As a contemporary and eloquent witness of Germany's Nazi nightmare, he undertook several lengthy international lecture tours of the years. Close to home, he engaged actively with the German-Dutch "Nooit meer / Nie wieder" ("Never again") organisation, serving for many years as chairman on the group's German side. He was also, over many years, a president of the Sachsenhausen Committee for West Germany.

In 1972 Werner Koch received his doctorate from the Protestant Faculty of Theology in Paris. His dissertation, also published in book form, concerned Gustav Heinemann.

== Honours ==
- 1991: Order of Merit of the Federal Republic of Germany
