= BDJ =

BDJ may refer to:

- British Dental Journal
- Syamsudin Noor Airport
- Bund Deutscher Jugend
