= Wolfgang Kaiser =

Wolfgang Kaiser may refer to:

- Wolfgang Kaiser (KgU) (1924–1952), member of Rainer Hildebrandt's "Struggle against Inhumanity" group KgU
- Wolfgang Kaiser (physicist) (1925–2023), German physicist
