= Kurt Schumann =

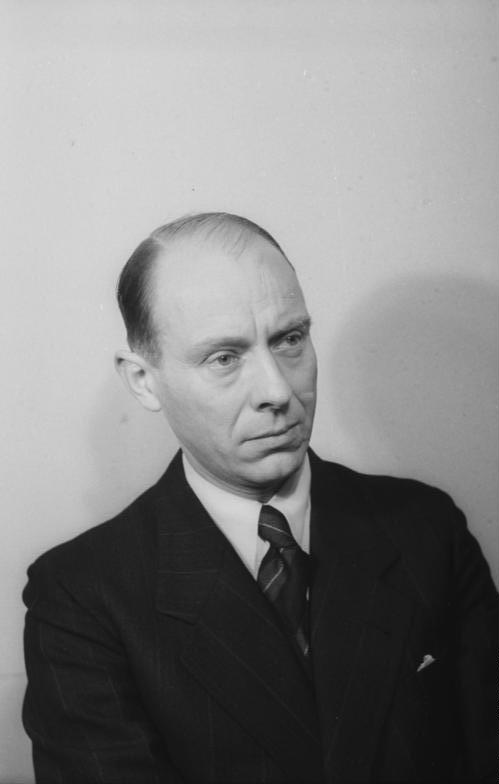
Kurt Schumann on December 7th, 1949

Kurt Schumann (29 April 1908 in Eisenach – 14 May 1989 in Berlin) was a German jurist and was the president of the Supreme Court of East Germany from 1949 until 1960.
