= Gerhard Benkowitz =

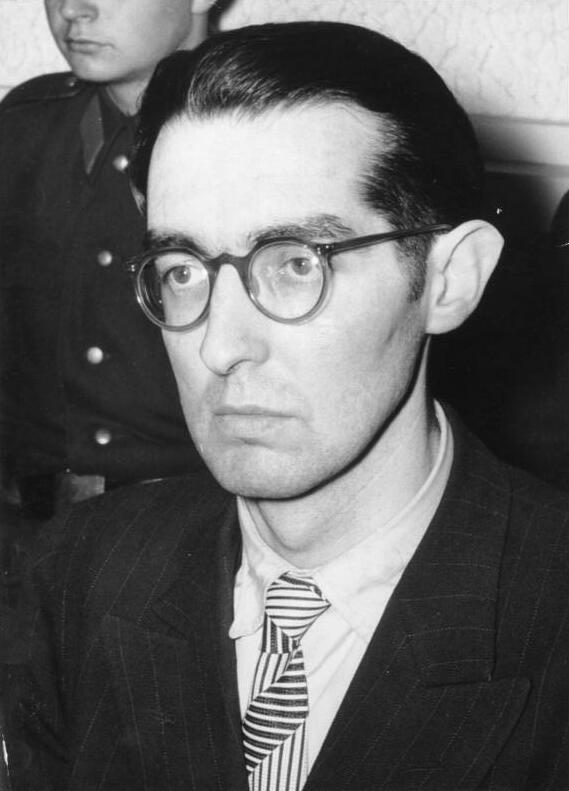
- Gerhard Benkowitz at his trial (1955)
- Born: 2 June 1923; Sudzhensk, Anzhero-Sudzhensk, Russian SFSR, Soviet Union
- Died: 29 June 1955 (aged 32); Münchner Platz Prison, Dresden, East Germany
- Cause of death: Execution by guillotine
- Occupation: Political activist
- Political party: LDPD (1946); SED (1948)
- Spouse: Adeline Luise Lydia Erika Heise/Benkowitz (1927-2008)

Gerhard Benkowitz (2 June 1923 – 29 June 1955) was a school teacher and a resistance activist against the one party dictatorship of the German Democratic Republic. He was a member of the KgU ("Combat Group against Inhumanity") and became a victim of the epidemic of show trials that hit the country in the first half of the 1950s. He was executed in June 1955.

== Life ==
=== Family ===
The father of Gerhard Benkowitz was an army officer from Apolda in Thuringia who had volunteered to serve in the First World War. However, he had been captured by the Russians in 1915 and held by them as a prisoner of war. The war ended in 1918 and the army officer from Germany had married an ethnic German descendant of the Germans settled in the area during the time of Catherine the Great in the eighteenth century. The couple were still in Russia when Gerhard was born, but the next year they were able to return to Germany, where the family settled in Weimar.

During the twelve year Nazi period the father held a position as an Ortsbauernführer (local farmers' leader).

=== War ===
War resumed in September 1939 with an agreed joint invasion of Poland by Germany and the Soviet Union. Benkowitz was still at school, but in 1941 he deferred his School final exams and applied for a commission as an army officer. Two years later, on 12 July 1943, he was badly wounded at the Battle of Kursk while serving in a tank-grenadier regiment. Following a lengthy convalescence, and with a serious limp which he would retain for the rest of his life, In 1944 he studied medicine for a term at Jena.

=== Aftermath of war ===
Peace broke out, formally, in May 1945. His home region of Thuringia had been liberated by US forces but the winning powers had already agreed between themselves occupation zones that placed Thuringia in the Soviet occupation zone, and within a month the Americans had withdrawn, to be replaced by Soviet Military Administration across the entire central third of what had been Germany. At this time Benkowitz's father was arrested by the Soviet Secret Police: he disappeared and his fate remains unknown. Benkowitz obtained work initially as a sales representative for a food business, and later as an officer with the town administration in Weimar. From the end of 1946 he was working for the Military Administration in Thuringia.

Politically there was initially a widespread belief that military defeat, by destroying the Hitler regime, had put an end to one- party government in Germany, and in the summer of 1946 Gerhard Benkowitz joined the newly established Liberal Democratic Party. During the autumn/fall of that year he resigned his party membership, however. As matters turned out 1946 was also the year in which the basis for a return to one- party government was established, with the contentious merger of the Communist Party and, within the Soviet occupation zone, of the more moderately left-wing Social Democratic Party, forming together the Socialist Unity Party (SED / Sozialdemokratische Partei Deutschlands). Within a couple of years former SPD members had been persuaded out of positions of influence within the new party which had soon become the East German Communist Party by another name. In 1948 Gerhard Benkowitz joined the country's ruling SED (party), probably on "professional grounds".

=== The Russian teacher ===
Gerhard Benkowitz's wife Erika also worked as a teacher at their local Pestalozzi School

In October 1949 Germany's Soviet occupation zone was refounded as the German Democratic Republic. Soviet sponsorship of the new state continued to be reflected by large numbers of Soviet military and administrative personnel in positions of authority, and in the schools there was a corresponding shortage of Russian language teachers. In 1949 Benkowitz became a Youth Development Leader in Weimar, and he also undertook a Russian course at a specialist school: in 1950 he took a job teaching Russian in nearby Buttstädt. He transferred to the Karl Marx School back in Weimar in 1951, and became in 1954 a deputy head teacher at the Pestalozzi School.

=== The KgU activist ===
In 1949 Gerhard Benkowitz began working with the Kampfgruppe gegen Unmenschlichkeit (KgU / "Combat Group against Inhumanity"), a Berlin-based anti-Communist human rights advocacy group widely believed to be funded and supported by US Intelligence. He hoped that the KgU's Berlin contacts would enable him to learn the whereabouts of his father who had been arrested by the Soviet secret police in 1945. Initially he delivered opinion reports to the KgU. In Autumn/Fall 1950 he created an illegal opposition cell-group which sometimes involved carrying an illegal weapon. In the period 1950-52 he was involved in the planning of missions involving explosives and sabotage, but none of these was ever implemented. They appear to have been contingency plans that could be implemented if mandated by the KgU's US sponsors. With the outbreak in 1950 of the Korean War there was a concern that something similar might blow up between the two politically polarised halves of Germany: if it had, the KgU would have been seen as a potential fifth column for the west behind the eastern front line, and the photographs accumulated by Benkowitz's Weimar based group of bridges and other installations vulnerable to sabotage would have been useful for identifying targets. After 1952 the KgU turned away from their militant strategy, however, and Benkowitz's group took to more directly political activities, such as distributing fly-leaflets, gathering information, and sending threatening letters to East German government officials.

=== Arrest ===
On 4 April 1955 Gerhard Benkowitz and his wife Erika were arrested in Weimar. The next day Hans-Dietrich and Christa Kogel were arrested, also in Weimar. These arrests were part of a wider Stasi operation carried out under the code name "Operation Blitz" ("Operation Lightning"). Benkowitz had probably been denounced to the Stasi by a fellow KgU member called Rupprecht Wagner who shortly afterwards left the organisation and in September 1955 joined the Stasi. Hans-Dietrich Kogel (1925–1955) was a clerical official with the Weimar City Council: his work involved in Planning and Statistics. The Weimar arrests coincided with others, including those of a courier called Willibald Schuster from Großebersdorf, a railway employee called Gerhard Kacher and a student called Christian Busch. Those arrested were taken initially to the Stasi prison in Erfurt, being transferred during ay 1955 to the principal Stasi pre-trial detention prison at Berlin. The two couples from Weimar knew each other, but had absolutely no connection with the others arrested. The show trial which took place subsequently had been planned by the Party Leadership at the beginning of 1955, but at that stage the Benkowitz and Kogel couples had not been listed as targets of "Operation Blitz". The decision to integrate their cases into the subsequent show trial appears to have been taken at very short notice.

During interrogation Gerhard Benkowitz admitted to his preparations for blowing up the Bleiloch valley dam, the six arch railway bridge at Weimar and other appropriate sabotage targets. Hans-Dietrich Kogel was to have been in charge of looking after the explosives. Gerhard Benkowitz and Hans-Dietrich Kogel separately provided detailed corroboratory statements on these aspects. Gerhard Benkowitz vehemently denied having been issued with explosives, and after an informant introduced into the suspects' detention cell obtained no countervailing evidence, this detail was removed from the charges against Benkowitz. The Stasi officers working on Benkowitz and the public defense lawyer had persuaded him that a detailed self-incrimination and remorse could save him. By believing the assurances he received he unwittingly supported the choreography of the show trial being prepared for him.

=== Trial ===
The trial opened formally on 14 June 1955. As in most show trials of the period, matters proceeded not according to professional legal principals but according to propagandist criteria. The more heavily implicated Weimar group members, Benkowitz and Kogel, were tried jointly with three other accused, Willibald Schuster and Gerhard Kammacher, rail workers from Triptis, and the Berlin Veterinary student Christian Busch, who was the only one of the five who was known, from the Stasi's own information, to have had direct contact with the KgU leader in Berlin, Gerd Baitz.

By the time the trial started, both the guilty verdict and the death sentence had been predetermined at the highest level. In Berlin the Party Central Committee had endorsed the proposal from Klaus Sorgenicht, head of the committee's "National and Legal Affairs Department", that Gerhard Benkowitz should be condemned to death. For his co-accused, Hans-Dietrich Kogel, Sorgenicht proposed a fifteen-year prison sentence: it was the head of state himself, Walter Ulbricht who rejected this advice in favour of a second death sentence for Kogel. The pattern for East German show trials had already been set earlier in the decade, and reaction to Benkowitz's trial had been carefully scripted. The national newspaper, Neues Deutschland, stated that "the entire anger of our people is directed against such creatures". The party newspaper also reported a letter from his teaching colleagues at the Pestalozzi School calling for "strong punishments against the five agents" ("die strenge Bestraffung der fünf Agenten") and pledging to be "more vigilant than ever in preventing diminution of the success of our Worker-Peasant state by criminal elements of this kind".

The actual court hearings took place on 22 and 23 June 1955. On 29 June 1955 the death sentences were carried out "in the name of the people". State execution had been centralised in Germany under the previous regime: Gerhard Benkowitz and Hans-Dietrich Kogel lost their lives at the National Execution Centre in Dresden.

=== Erika ===
Gerhard Benkowitz's wife Erika also worked as a teacher at their local Pestalozzi School. She had been arrested with him, and was sentenced on 20 July by a court in Erfurt to a twelve-year prison sentence. The court asserted that she should have assumed that the stories and reports that she had helped her husband compile would have been used for espionage purposes. She nevertheless survived the experience, and lived on till 2008.
