= Kampfgruppe gegen Unmenschlichkeit =

German anti-communist resistance group

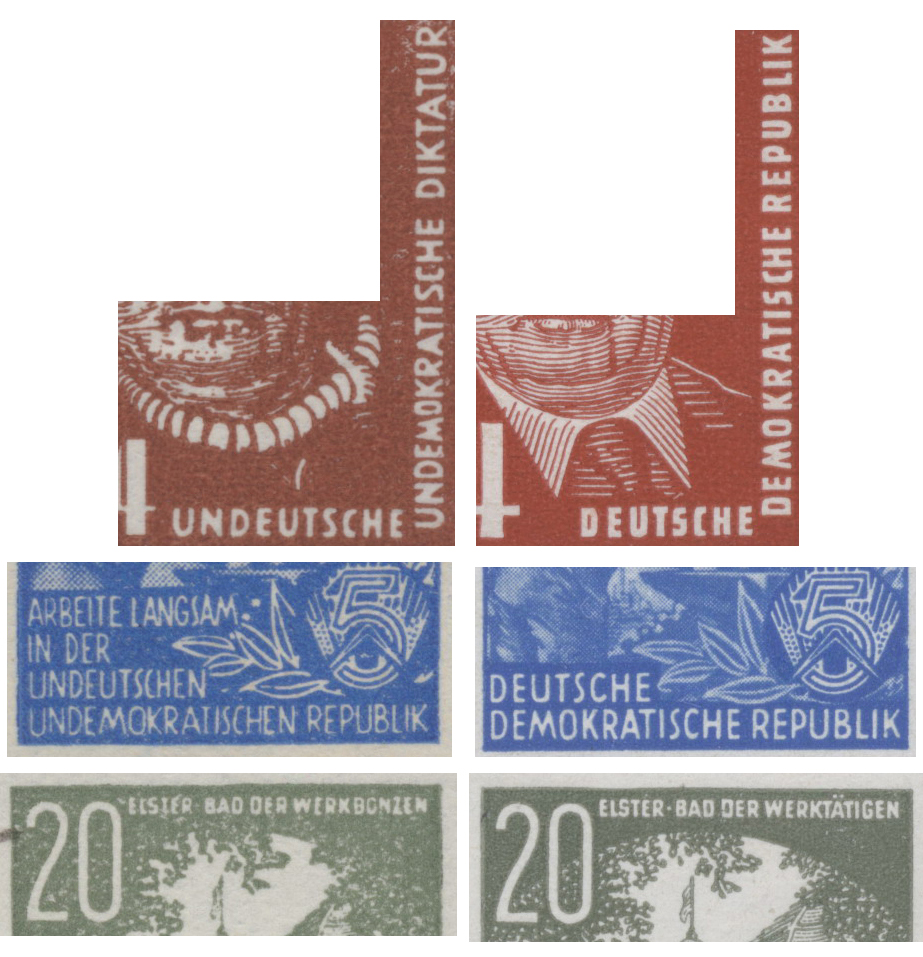
- Counterpropaganda produced by the KgU- the left is the fake and the right is the original
- Formation: 1948
- Founder: Rainer Hildebrandt; Günther Birkenfeld; Ernst Benda
- Dissolved: 1959; 67 years ago
- Type: Resistance group
- Location: West Berlin, Germany
- Key people: Ernst Tillich

The Kampfgruppe gegen Unmenschlichkeit (KgU) (German: "Combat Group against Inhumanity") was a German CIA-funded anti-communist militant group based in West Berlin. It was founded in 1948 by Rainer Hildebrandt, Günther Birkenfeld, and Ernst Benda, and existed until 1959. Hildebrandt would later establish the Checkpoint Charlie Museum.

== History ==
The KgU received significant financial support from several Western intelligence agencies as well as the government of West Germany and the Ford Foundation. The US Army's Counterintelligence Corps (CIC) provided funding to help materialize the group's creation in the late 1940s. By the early 1950s, the Central Intelligence Agency (CIA) gradually replaced the CIC as the KgU's most prominent American backer. According to CIA documents, the KgU ran approximately 500 agents in East Germany in the early 1950s, which, according to historian Enrico Heitzer, put it on par with the Gehlen Organization, the predecessor to the West German intelligence service Bundesnachrichtendienst.

The KgU's activities included sabotage, arson, and poison attacks. The group also waged aggressive economic warfare, such as Operation Osterhase ("Easter Bunny"), in which it sent 150,000 fake letters to East German stores, ordering drastic price cuts in order to cause a run on already scarce consumer goods. Other activities included collecting data on individuals imprisoned in East Germany and passing it on to their relatives, as well as collecting names of informers to the East German government and passing it on to RIAS, which would then broadcast so-called "snitch reports" in order to silence informers and discourage others from engaging in similar activities. It also printed and distributed a satirical magazine, Tarantel, in East Germany.

The KgU also aided the CIA in building up a so-called stay-behind network to be used in the event of a hypothetical Soviet invasion. Infiltration of the KgU by Stasi operatives and the arrest of several of its agents in East Germany eventually caused the group to dissolve in 1959, with many of its records going to the CIA.

Although some KgU members, such as Rainer Hildebrandt and Ernst Tillich, had served time in prison during the Third Reich for anti-Nazi activities, as historian Enrico Heitzer points out, the group consisted of numerous activists with a Nazi past, many of whom hadn't changed their political views.

The KgU was infiltrated by Stasi informants when the organization was still active.

== Notable members ==
- Rainer Hildebrandt, founding member
- Günther Birkenfeld, founding member
- Ernst Benda, founding member
- Ernst Tillich, chairman
- Johann Burianek, executed in 1952
- Wolfgang Kaiser, executed in 1952
- Gerhard Benkowitz, executed in 1955

== Alleged terrorist activities in East Germany ==
William Blum claimed that the group carried out the following actions in East Germany:

- Engaging in industrial sabotage against power stations, factories, shipyards, canals, dams, gas stations, shops, public transport, public buildings, a dam and a radio station using methods including explosives, arson, short circuiting and contaminating machinery with sand and special acids.
- Engaging in sabotage against the transport infrastructure of East Germany, through methods such as derailing freight trains, destroying key equipment on freight trains, blowing up road and railway bridges, burning the cars of one freight train and in one case attempting to blow up bridge of the Berlin-Moscow railway line.
- Poisoning and killing 7000 cows in a dairy cooperative by poisoning the wax coating of the wire used to bale corn fodder.
- Adding soap to powdered milk destined for East German schools.
- Raided and attacked left-wing offices in West and East Berlin to steal membership lists, in order to assault leftists and in some cases to kidnap and murder them.
- Attempting to disrupt the World Youth Festival in East Berlin by sending out forged invitations, false promises of free bed and board, false notices of cancellations; carried out attacks on participants with explosives, firebombs, and tire-puncturing equipment; set fire to a wooden bridge on a main motorway leading to the festival.
- Attempting to cause chaos for economic planners by forging ration cards to cause shortages and confusion, forged tax notices and government directives to cause disorganization and inefficiency within industry and unions.

== See also ==
- Anti-Bolshevik Bloc of Nations
- Albanian Subversion
- Bund Deutscher Jugend
- Forest Brothers
- Operation Cyclone
- Operation Gladio
- Operation Jungle
