= Tarantel (magazine) =

Satirical magazine in West Germany (1950–1962)

- Editor-in-chief: Heinrich Bär
- Categories: Satirical magazine
- Frequency: Monthly
- Publisher: Freiheitsverlag Leipzig; Heinrich Bär Verlag
- Founder: Heinrich Bär
- Founded: 1950
- Final issue: 1962
- Country: West Germany
- Based in: Berlin
- Language: German

Tarantel (Turkish: Tarantula) was a German monthly satirical magazine in Berlin, West Germany, which was in circulation between 1950 and 1962. Being a propaganda publication it was started to address the readers in East Germany and was funded by the American intelligence organization CIA.

== History and profile ==
Tarantel was launched in West Berlin in 1950. Its founder was the German journalist Heinz Wenzel, known as Heinrich Bär, who also edited the magazine. The magazine was first published by Freiheitsverlag Leipzig in a miniature format on a monthly basis. Later Heinrich Bär Verlag became the publisher of the magazine. The company employed Tarantel as part of its propaganda war against East Germany which was ridiculed by the magazine. It also mocked the establishment of the Soviet Union, the Communist Party of East Germany and East German government officials.

Christian F. Ostermann argues that the Kampfgruppe gegen Unmenschlichkeit (KgU) (German: Combat Group against Inhumanity) was behind the magazine. As of 1952 the magazine was among six German organizations which were financed by the US as tools of psychological manipulation in East Germany. Tarantel was funded by the Central Intelligence Agency of the US. The magazine was illegally circulated in East Germany, and possession of it was strictly banned by the East German government. In the late 1950s it sold 250,000-300,000 copies in West Berlin. The magazine folded in 1962.
