= Friedrich Weißler =

German lawyer and judge

Friedrich Weißler

(Georg) Friedrich Weißler (born 28 April 1891 in Königshütte, Upper Silesia; died 19 February 1937 at Sachsenhausen concentration camp) was a German lawyer and judge. Born into a Jewish family and baptized Protestant, he joined the Christian resistance against the Nazi regime after the Nazis had destroyed his judicial career.

== Early life ==
Friedrich Weißler was the youngest of three sons of the lawyer and notary Adolf Weißler and his wife Auguste (née Hayn). Departing from Judaism, his father had him, like his brothers, baptized in infancy by a Protestant pastor.

In 1893, the family moved to Halle, where Friedrich attended school. After graduating from high school, he began studying law at the Martin Luther University Halle-Wittenberg. Like his father and brothers, he became a member of the Ascania Halle singers’ association. He transferred to the University of Bonn, joining a music association there as well. In 1913, he served as a one-year volunteer in the Prussian Army. He then joined the Eilenburg district court as a law clerk. In 1914, he received his doctorate in Halle. At the beginning of the first World War, Weißler enlisted as a volunteer in the German army. Reaching the rank of lieutenant, he served on the war front until 1918.

== Judicial career destroyed by Nazis ==
Weißler resumed his legal clerkship in Halle in 1920. After completing it, he received a position in the Prussian judiciary. He then served at various courts, including the Naumburg superior court and the Halle labor court. In October 1932, he was appointed presiding judge of the Magdeburg regional court.

A few months after Weißler began presiding as judge in Magdeburg, Hitler took power. In February 1933, in a criminal case he was judging, Weißler sentenced an SA (storm trooper) man, who appeared illegally in court in full uniform, to a small fine for improper behavior. A short time later, a group of SA men assaulted Weißler in his office, beating and kicking him. Presenting him to an aroused mob on the balcony of the district court, they forced Weißler to salute a swastika flag. SA men then dragged him through the city streets and detained him for a short time in an SA camp. In August 1933 Weißler was dismissed as a judge, due to his Jewish origins and resistance to Nazis.

== Joins Protestant opposition to Nazis ==
Weißler moved to Berlin and began working with the Protestant opposition (Confessing Church) within the Evangelical Church of the old-Prussian Union. Starting November 1934 as legal advisor for the opposition, he helped Inundate old-Prussian state bishop Ludwig Müller and his minions with a wave of litigation in the ordinary courts, contesting Müller's arbitrary measures that violated the church constitution (Kirchenordnung). Since Müller usually acted without legal basis, the courts often upheld the litigants’ claims.

Weißler had already worked as legal advisor to the first Preliminary Church Executive, a body organised by the Confessing Church as an alternative to the Nazi-submissive German Evangelical Church. He was also appointed legal advisor to the second Preliminary Church Executive, and later became its office manager.

=== Memorandum to Hitler ===
On Pentecost 1936 (31 May), the second Preliminary Church Executive prepared a “memorandum” (Denkschrift) to Adolf Hitler, also to be read from the pulpits on 23 August 1936, condemning anti-Semitism, Nazi concentration camps and state terrorism. The memorandum was delivered to Hitler at the Chancellery on 4 June 1936 — but there was no reaction from the government. A draft was then leaked to and published in the foreign press in July 1936, during the build-up to the Olympic Games.

If blood, race, nationhood and honour are given the rank of eternal values, so the Evangelical Christian is compelled by the First Commandment, to oppose that judgement. If the Aryan human is glorified, so it is God's word, which testifies the sinfulness of all human beings. If — in the scope of the National Socialist world view — anti-Semitism, requiring hatred of the Jews, is imposed on the individual Christian, so for him the Christian virtue of charity stands against that.

The memorandum concluded that the Nazi regime would definitely lead the German people into disaster.

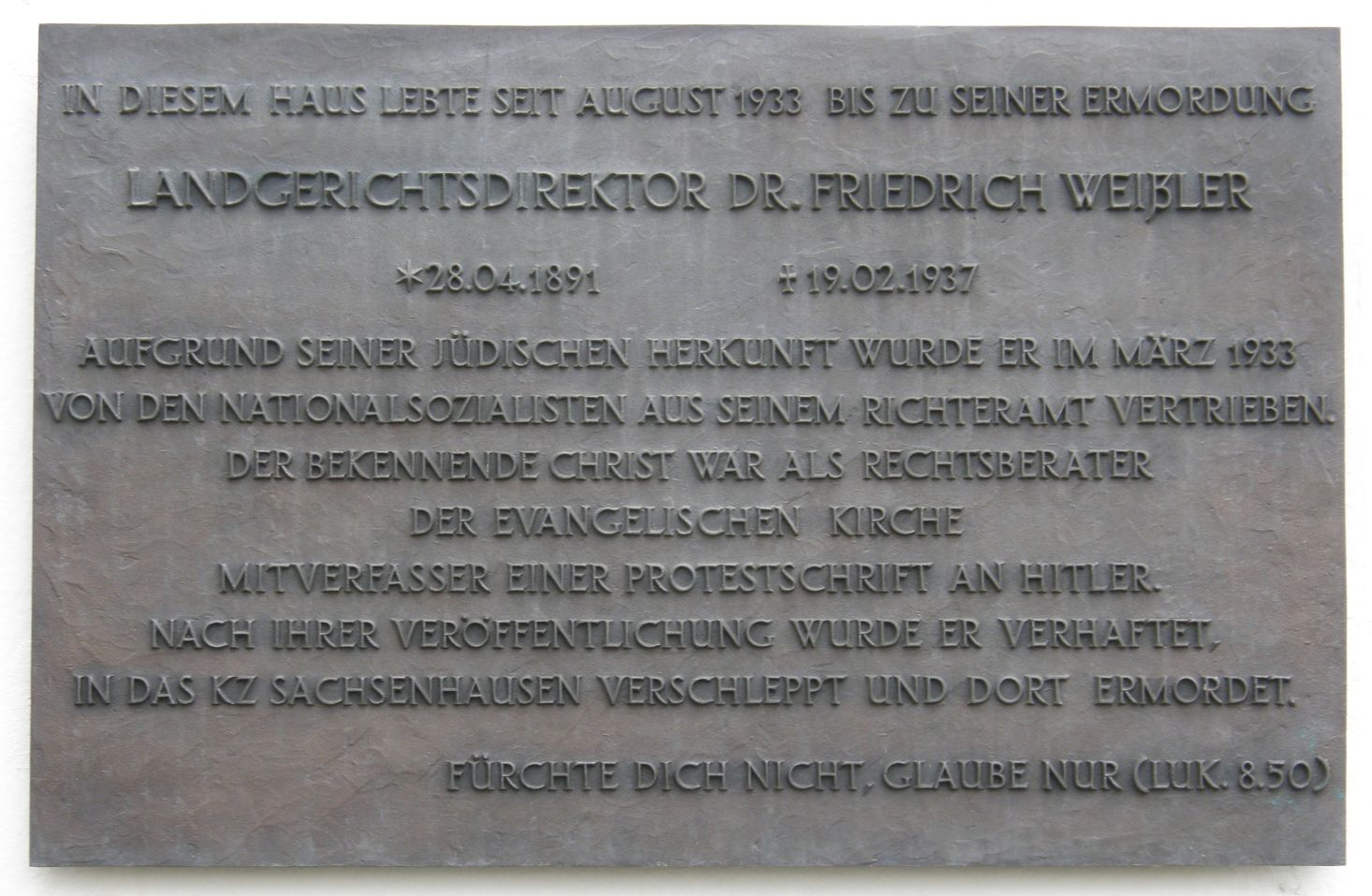
A memorial plate in Berlin

=== Arrest and deportation to Sachsenhausen ===
On 7 October 1936, the Gestapo arrested Weißler and two “Aryan” assistants who also worked for the Confessing Church — erroneously accusing them of passing the memorandum into the hands of foreign media. Whereas the Aryans were ultimately released, the church did not intervene on Weißler's behalf. Had he been taken to court, he could easily have exposed the false evidence implicating him in a crime against the Nazi regime. But instead, Weißler was summarily deported to Sachsenhausen concentration camp. There, he was tortured to death from 13 to 19 February 1937. Weißler was the first “full-blooded Jew” murdered in the Kirchenkampf on the Protestant side.
