= Jeffrey Carney =

U.S. Air Force intelligence specialist convicted of spying

Jeffrey Martin Carney is a former United States Air Force intelligence specialist convicted of spying for the East German Ministry for State Security (MfS or Stasi). One of Stasi's most successful spies, code-named "Kid" or "Uwe", Carney became alienated and angry at the U.S. Air Force and U.S. policies under President Ronald Reagan. He began handing over U.S. military documents to the Stasi while working in West Berlin for the U.S. Air Force. After his transfer back to Goodfellow Air Force Base in 1984, Carney decided to once again request permanent asylum in East Germany. His whereabouts remained unknown until 1990 and he was carried on the rolls as a deserter.

Carney was finally apprehended after the fall of the Berlin Wall by special agents of the United States Air Force Office of Special Investigations (AFOSI) on April 22, 1991, at Pintschstraße 12 in the Friedrichshain district of Berlin.

== Biography ==
Carney entered the U.S. Air Force in December 1980. From April 1982 to April 1984 he was assigned to the 6912th Electronic Security Group, Electronic Security Command at Tempelhof Central Airport in Berlin as a linguist and intelligence specialist, with duty station at the 6912th Marienfelde Field Site.

== Alienation ==
In the ZDF film Informationen um jeden Preis, Carney admitted his homosexuality was the primary reason he became a spy. Carney quickly became disillusioned with the Air Force and its intelligence gathering operations, and there are several stories of him attempting to turn in his badge and quit in protest. His first-hand experiences during the NATO exercise Able Archer 83 strengthened his resolve to help avoid a nuclear conflict. Later, lonely, alienated, and under psychological stress, and he felt he had no one to talk to about his problems. He had intended to defect to East Germany on his first crossing, but he allowed himself to be drawn into espionage by East German intelligence agents who expertly manipulated him and claimed his complete loyalty.

== Spying ==
While working at the Marienfelde Field Site in Berlin, Carney began copying classified documents which he then provided to the Stasi by repeatedly crossing back and forth into East Germany. In 1984 he was involuntarily transferred to Goodfellow Air Force Base in Texas to work as a technical instructor. Carney believed Goodfellow was a training base with no real-world intelligence of any interest to the Stasi. He soon discovered that he had been wrong. Carney continued providing the Stasi with documents, meeting his handlers in Mexico City and Rio de Janeiro in 1985. Feeling cut off from his supervisors in East Berlin and at increasing risk in what became known as "The Year of the Spy" he sought out the protection of the East German embassy in Mexico City. From there he was flown to Havana with the assistance of the Cuban government. Weeks later he returned to East Berlin via Prague. There he continued to work for Stasi (HVA Abt. XI and HA III) by intercepting and translating non-secure telephone communications of U.S. military commanders as well as the East German telephone lines dedicated to the U.S. embassy in East Berlin.

== Lifestyle and recognition ==
During the course of his spying, Carney provided Stasi and other Eastern Bloc intelligence services with more than one hundred top-secret U.S. military documents. For his services to East Germany, he was awarded the NVA service medal in bronze and the medal of "Waffenbrüderschaft (Brotherhood in Arms)" in gold. His internal Stasi file shows the value of the work he performed for the Stasi and the KGB, earning praise from KGB General Chebrikov as well as from General Zaitsev of the Group of Soviet Forces in Germany (GSFG).

== Capture ==
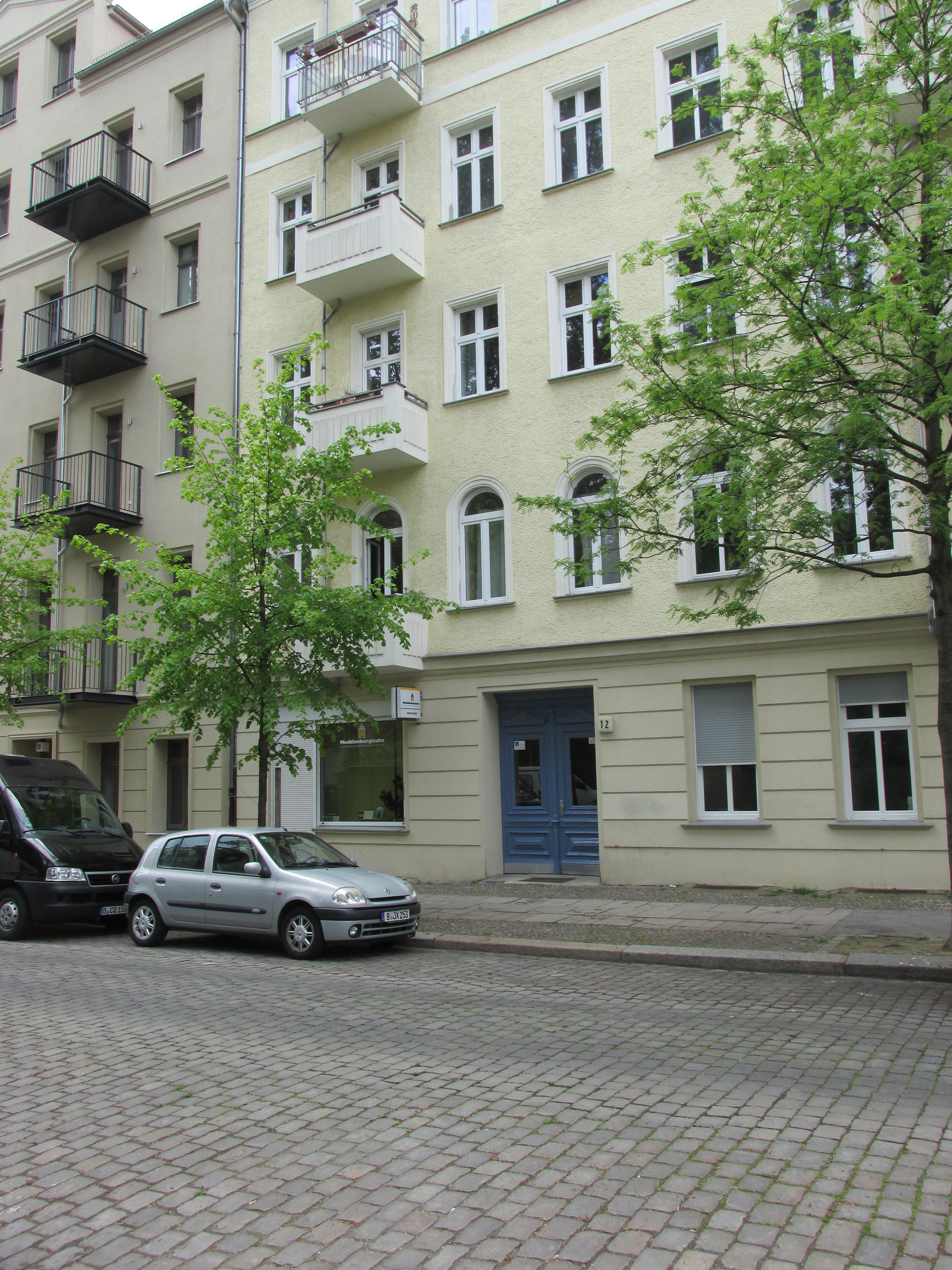
Pintschstraße 12, 10249 Berlin-Friedrichshain, taken 23 April 2014.

A break in the case came after the fall of the Berlin Wall in November 1989, when many Stasi records became available to foreign investigators and journalists. In April, 1991, Carney was located with the help of at least two former Stasi intelligence officers turned informants. In preparation for his apprehension, he was quickly assigned to the 7350th Air Base Group at his former base, Tempelhof Central Airport, several months before his apprehension. (This assignment was official and had the unintended consequence of assigning Carney to a unit that supported Desert Shield/Desert Storm in 1991. As a result, Carney received the National Defense Service Medal while in solitary confinement at Fort Leavenworth, Kansas, several years later.) On 22 April 1991, Carney was apprehended on a public street by AFOSI agents near his residence on Pintschstraße 12, in Friedrichshain, which used to be in the Soviet sector of Berlin. Immediately following his apprehension, he was taken to Tempelhof Airport, identified, and underwent nearly 28 hours of intense interrogation; after this, Carney refused to answer any more questions after his repeated requests for counsel had been denied. At this point the AFOSI, in consultation with other U.S. agencies, decided to quietly remove Carney from German territory. He was secretly flown to the United States aboard military aircraft the following day. Carney's arrest and return to the United States was coordinated at the highest levels of the United States government without consulting German officials. The U.S. Ambassador to the Federal Republic of Germany, Vernon Walters, personally acted as adviser to the Commander-in-Chief, United States Air Forces Europe, urging haste.

== Conviction ==
Carney pleaded guilty to charges of espionage, conspiracy, and desertion and was sentenced in December 1991 to 38 years in prison. Carney served the mandatory portion of his sentence at both Quantico, Virginia, and, later, the United States Disciplinary Barracks in Fort Leavenworth, Kansas. Carney was released in 2002, after serving 11 years, seven months, and twenty days on a twenty-year sentence in accordance with his pretrial agreement.

== Later life ==
After his release from prison, Carney attempted to return to Germany claiming to be a German citizen. However, as East Germany never naturalized him as a citizen and thus he had obtained his German passport fraudulently, German authorities refused to grant him a passport. He is reported to be living in Ohio. In November 2011 Carney submitted a lengthy manuscript detailing his life as a spy to the United States Air Force for security review. After numerous delays, the manuscript was finally cleared on July 26, 2012. The book, Against All Enemies: An American's Cold War Journey, was published in 2013.
