= Supreme Court of East Germany =

Supreme judicial organ of East Germany

Coordinates: 52.532°N 13.373°E

Supreme Court of the GDR
- Oberstes Gericht der DDR
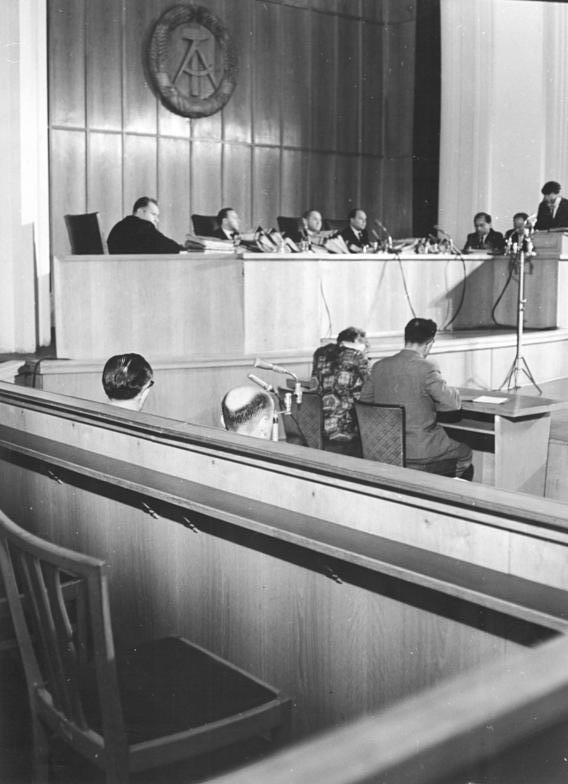
- Established: 1949
- Dissolved: 1990
- Location: East Berlin
- Language: German

The Supreme Court of the German Democratic Republic (German: Oberstes Gericht der DDR) was the supreme judicial organ of East Germany. It was set up in 1949 and was housed on Scharnhorststraße 6 in Berlin. The building now houses the district court in Berlin, Germany 2 Instance and the District Court Berlin-Mitte. In the early days, 14 judges made up the court. It was disestablished in 1990.

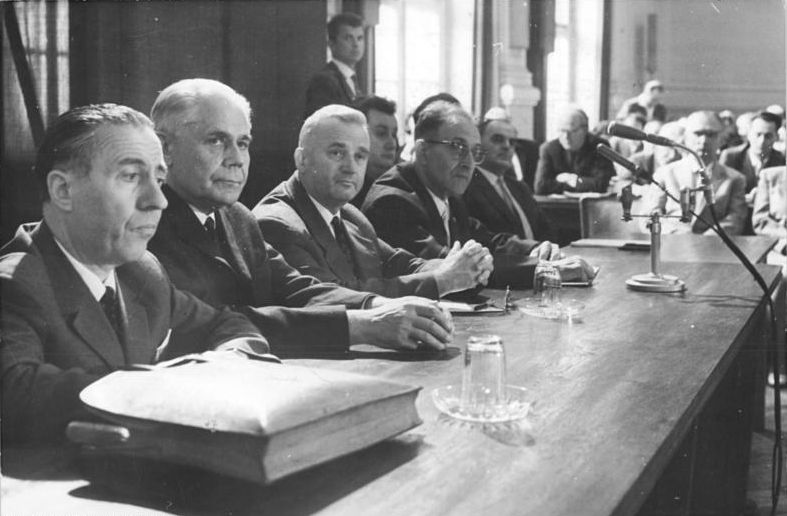
Supreme Court in 1963

== Responsibilities ==
Among the responsibilities of the court included

- The conduct of criminal proceedings in the first body, in which the Supreme Public Prosecutor of the Republic because of the paramount importance of prosecuting cases before the Supreme Court raised
- Cassation in civil and criminal matters
- vocation against decisions of acquittal for annulment actions of Office for invention and patent system in patent invalidity matters.

Later other tasks were added, mainly due to the process of simplification which is attributable to the pace of DDR-Justiz.

Neither separate constitutional court nor special administrative, social and financial court systems existed in the GDR, with constitutional review vested in the People's Chamber as a legislative rather than judicial function.

== Notable figures ==
- Presidents: Kurt Schumann (1949–1960, NDPD), Heinrich Toeplitz (1960–86, CDU), Günter Sarge (1986–1989, SED)
- Vice President: Hilde Benjamin (1949–1953, SED); Vice President and Chairman of the College of Criminal Law: Walter Ziegler, (new 1st Vice President) Guenter Sarge (1977–1986)
- Chairman of the College in civil, family and employment law: Werner Strasberg Mountain
- General Prosecutors: Ernst Melsheimer (1949–1960, SED), Josef Streit (1962–1986), Guenter Wendland (1986–1989), Harri Harland (1989 / 1990), Hans-Juergen Joseph (1-6/1990);
