= Günther Birkenfeld =

German writer (1901–1966)

Günther Birkenfeld (9 March 1901 - 22 August 1966) was a German writer. His books were banned during the Nazi years but he remained in the country and was conscripted for aircraft monitoring during the war. During the postwar period, in what had become the Soviet occupation zone, he was a co-founder, in 1948/49, of the anti-communist Combat Group against Inhumanity ("Kampfgruppe gegen Unmenschlichkeit").

== Life ==
Günther Birkenfeld was born in Cottbus and grew up in Berlin. He received his doctorate in 1923, and went on to work as an editor with the Paul Neff publishing house. Between 1927 and 1930 he was General Secretary of the Protection Association of German Authors (Schutzverband deutscher Schriftsteller). His youthful novel Dritter Hof links (published in English as A Room in Berlin) appeared in 1929, and was well received, also appearing in translation.

The political backdrop changed savagely in January 1933 when the Nazi Party took power and converted Germany into a one-party dictatorship. Birkenfeld's first novel was banned in Germany (although the English language translation appears still to have been available in London). Dritter Hof links appeared again on the list of banned books, together with his subsequent novel Liebesferne (1930), when the list was updated and reissued in 1938. During the twelve years the Nazis were in power, Birkenfeld (as he later explained to Alfred Kantorowicz in 1947) managed to carry on in what was termed inner emigration in a low profile lectureship, also producing several popular biographical novels including one on Johann Gutenberg and another on the emperor Augustus. He was also conscripted, during the Second World War, for aircraft monitoring.

War ended in May 1945 and Berlin was divided into zones of occupation between the principal victor nations. Birkenfeld obtained a licence from the US occupation zone to edit and produce a twice monthly newssheet entitled Horizon: Newssheet for the younger generation (Horizont: Zeitschrift der jungen Generation). The title defined its target readership. Contributors were for the most part also from the younger generation, writing about problems of reorientation and training for a transformed postwar era. Under the leadership of the 45 year old Birkenfeld the young journalists rejected any form of intellectual suppression of important themes. That was particular criticism of the energetic ideological kidnapping of youth by the new Socialist Unity Party (Sozialistische Einheitspartei Deutschlands / SED) and its youth wing, the Free German Youth (Freie Deutsche Jugend / FDJ) across Berlin, most notably in the Soviet occupation zone which incorporated what would become known as East Berlin. The newssheet dealt primarily with political and social matters, but also featured a section headed "The arts of the future" and, from 1948, an "Experiments" section which provided a forum for established younger literary contributors such as Wolfdietrich Schnurre (1920–1989), Arnim Juhre (1925–2015) and Ingeborg Euler (1927–2005). Horizon ceased to appear in September 1948 after newsprint (paper) ran out due to the Berlin Blockade.

On 9 November 1945 the Protection Association of German Authors was reinstated under authority from the Soviet occupation forces in the eastern part of Berlin, now as a division of the Free German Trade Union Federation, and Birkenfeld was installed as a member of its executive. He retained this function, as the political and economic division of the city (and of the country) progressively became more visible and permanent, till 1949. In his approach to former Nazis, Birkenfeld took a hard line. This was on display in the "Hausmann debate" in April 1947 at which Günther Weisenborn argued for a more nuanced position, whereby there should indeed be a very harsh approach to former Nazi activist criminals, but otherwise "display generosity". For Weisenborn this meant that despite recent reproaches to Thomas Mann, the author should nevertheless be invited to the 1947 writers' congress; Birkenfeld rejected this.

The first German Writers' Congress took place between 4 and 8 October 1947 in the eastern sector of Berlin, and was addressed by Birkenfeld on the theme of "Collaboration of Writers' Organisations" (Zusammenarbeit der Schriftstellerorganisationen). On the morning of 7 October he was elected to chair the day's proceedings. The morning was dominated by a keynote speech from Melvin J. Lasky who was deeply critical of censorship in the Soviet Union and the persecution of the Soviet writers Mikhail Zoshchenko and Anna Akhmatova. This, in turn, drew strong protests from Soviet guest delegates at the congress, in a session choreographed by Birkenfeld.

Birkenfeld was one of twenty German writers nominated to found a German section of PEN International, based on a resolution of the international organisation at its twentieth congress in Copenhagen. This followed consultation with PEN International's General Secreatary Hermon Ould, and with Wilhelm Unger representing the London exile group. The group of twenty fulfilled their mandate with a launch congress at Göttingen on 18–20 November 1948, under the leadership of Hermann Friedmann.

As it became apparent that the ground was being cleared, especially within the Soviet occupation zone, for a return to one-party dictatorship under the Socialist Unity Party of Germany, Birkenfeld was taking am increasingly public position against Communism, at least from the launch of the Berlin Blockade in June 1948, and possibly earlier. On 19 September 1948 he was a co-founder of the "League for Spiritual Freedom" (Liga für Geistesfreiheit). Early in 1949 he was a co-founder of the anti-communist Combat Group against Inhumanity (Kampfgruppe gegen Unmenschlichkeit). In 1950, together with Theodor Plievier and Rudolf Pechel, Birkenfeld called for the separation of the German PEN organisation from the "Becker Group" which represented the organisation in what had become, formally in October 1949, the separate German Democratic Republic (East Germany). This led directly to the establishment in 1951 of a separate West German PEN organisation under the presidency of Erich Kästner.

Birkenfeld worked as a political commentator with the Broadcasting Service in the American Sector (RIAS) (of Berlin). and as an editor with the publishing house Suhrkamp Verlag. At Suhrkamp he became embroiled in controversy when he demanded that the author Anna Seghers should at least mention somewhere in her novel Die Toten bleiben jung that German soldiers involved in the invasion of the Soviet Union had not been universally hostile to the civilian communities - there had been some who had befriended the population. In the dispute that ensued, the proprietor Peter Suhrkamp distanced himself from Birkenfeld's demands, and it was left to the company's publishing director Erich Wendt to negotiate a solution with a determined author.
