= Rainer Hildebrandt =

German anti-communist resistance fighter and historian

Rainer Hildebrandt

Rainer Hildebrandt (December 14, 1914 – January 9, 2004) was a German anti-communist resistance fighter, historian and founder of the Checkpoint Charlie Museum. He was involved in the resistance to the communist regime of the Soviet occupation zone since the 1940s, as a member of the Kampfgruppe gegen Unmenschlichkeit.

== Early life ==
Rainer Hildebrandt, son of the art historian Hans Hildebrandt and the painter Lily Hildebrandt, studied physics in Berlin, later philosophy and sociology at the Faculty of Foreign Studies, and earned his doctorate under Franz Rupp on a topic in psychology. At his university, a lively circle of resistant lecturers and students gathered from 1939/40 on. Among them were Harro Schulze-Boysen and Horst Heilmann as well as the professor Albrecht Haushofer and the student Rainer Hildebrandt. He had contact with the wider circle of the July 20, 1944, conspirators and was a member of the Haushofer circle: "A long look goes out to the companions. I lost my best friends, Albrecht Haushofer and Horst Heilmann, in the Nazi Reich and was myself imprisoned for 17 months. I learned to fight against injustice." Hildebrandt was imprisoned for "Wehrkraftzersetzung" and connections to resistance groups.

== Founder of the Combat Group against Inhumanity ==
After the beginning of the Cold War, Hildebrandt, together with the writer Günther Birkenfeld, the then chairman of the Junge Union Ernst Benda and the then FDP city councilor Herbert Geisler, founded the anti-communist Kampfgruppe gegen Unmenschlichkeit (KgU), which was financed by secret services, as a licensee of the Allied Command. At the beginning, this Kampfgruppe was headed by Rainer Hildebrandt, whose main goal was initially to set up a tracing service to track down the many arrested and disappeared or abducted and missing and deceased persons in the Soviet occupation zone. Other files existed in parallel, such as one of denunciators who had imprisoned fellow citizens or those that provided information on the political, economic and military situation.

According to his own account, there were three kidnapping attempts against Hildebrandt, including by the GDR State Security. According to Hildebrandt's recollections, the first kidnapping attempt failed on July 24, 1949.

=== Alledged Terrorist Activities ===
Research conducted by William Blum in the post Cold war era has linked the KgU with attempted terrorist attacks on civilian targets in the former East Germany, including attempts to doctor milk intended for schoolchildren, and poisoning cattle with contaminated feed bales. Blum did not find, however, definitive evidence that Hildebrandt directed the KgU to commit these acts.

== 1952 until his death ==
After his retirement from the KgU, Hildebrandt devoted most of his time to public relations work and then to the Arbeitsgemeinschaft 13. August, which was founded shortly after the construction of the Berlin Wall. Until the end, Hildebrandt directed the Checkpoint Charlie Museum.

On October 1, 1992, Hildebrandt was awarded the Order of Merit of the State of Berlin, and in 1994 Roman Herzog awarded him the Federal Cross of Merit I Class. In 1995 Hildebrandt married Alexandra Hildebrandt. On January 9, 2004, Rainer Hildebrandt died at the age of 89.

In 2004, the International Human Rights Award Dr.-Rainer-Hildebrandt-Medaille was established. It is awarded annually since 2005 to individuals who have campaigned for human rights in a non-violent manner. The jury includes Henry Kissinger, Avi Primor, Joachim Gauck, Hans-Dietrich Genscher, and Sergei Khrushchev.

== Publications ==
- Rainer Hildebrandt: Ein tragischer Auftakt zur deutschen Teilung und zur Mauer (Neuauflage der 1948 erstmals erschienenen Publikation * … die besten Köpfe, die man henkt, ergänzt durch zahlreiche Fotos und Originalunterlagen); Verlag Arbeitsgemeinschaft 13. August: ISBN 978-3-922484-48-6
- Als die Fesseln fielen … Neun Schicksale in einem Aufstand
- Von Gandhi bis Walesa – Gewaltfreier Kampf für Menschenrechte
- Die Mauer spricht
- Es geschah an der Mauer
- Wir Sind Die Letzten - Aus Dem Leben Des Widerstandskampfers Albrecht Haushofer Und Seiner Freunde. Michael Verlang Neuwied / Berlin. 1949.

== Literature ==
- Alexandra Hildebrandt: Ein Mensch Rainer Hildebrandt – Begegnungen Verl. Haus am Checkpoint Charlie, Berlin 1999, ISBN 3-922484-41-7
