= Bund Deutscher Jugend =

Politically active German association

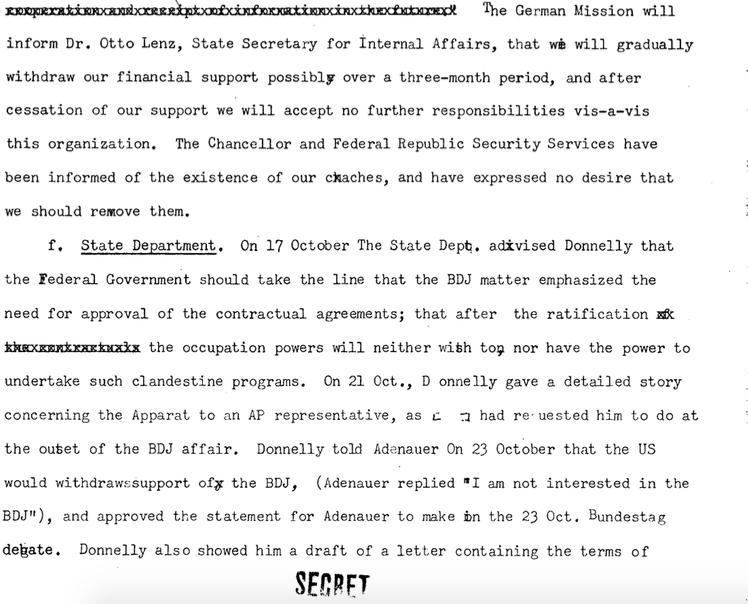
CIA draft memorandum on BDJ financing

The Bund Deutscher Jugend (BDJ, English: League of German Youth) was a politically active German association with extreme right-wing anti-communist leanings, founded in 1950. In the beginning of 1953 the BDJ and its paramilitary arm, the Technischer Dienst, were forbidden as extreme right-wing organisations because of the planned murder of roughly 40 people and the creation of a secret organization.

== Prohibition proceedings ==
A 1952 raid by local police units on the BDJ's premises revealed that the U.S. funded the organization with a monthly budget of $50,000 and supplied it with arms, ammunition, and explosives. A weapons cache consisting of machine guns, grenades, light artillery guns, and explosives was found in the Odenwald near Frankfurt am Main. Seized documents also contained an assassination list naming 40 German political leaders - mainly politicians of the German social democratic party, SPD. Among them were Herbert Wehner, the former head of the SPD party, Erich Ollenhauer, the Hessian Minister of the Interior, Heinrich Zinnkann, and the Mayor of Hamburg and Bremen. For a case of "emergency" scenario, the BDJ had already funnelled members in the SPD. The U.S. Army Counter Intelligence Corps (CIC) took over custody of the German BDJ members and denied West German authorities access to them in the following months because the authorities intended to indict the members on charges of unlawful possession of weapons and planned murder. CIC agents continued to seize all remaining documents and refused to surrender them to West German authorities. As a result of the ongoing investigation, U.S. authorities admitted to having paid the BDJ to train guerrillas in case of war with the Soviet Union.

== Ideology ==
The Hessian federal Office for the Protection of the Constitution first described the BDJ in their reports as "strongly right wing" and "not yet an immediate danger to society". The office later amended the reports and added that the shift of the BDJ into right wing extremism was viewed as a possibility.

On 9 September 1952, the high ranking BDJ member and former SS-Hauptsturmführer, Hans Otto, who created a "hit list" with the names of 40 German politicians for the BDJ, surrendered himself to the police.

The BDJ was reclassified as an "unconstitutional right wing extremist group" and subsequently banned by the federal state of Hesse on 7 January 1953 and the other states by February of the same year.

== See also ==
- Kampfgruppe gegen Unmenschlichkeit
- Operation Gladio

== Bibliography ==
- All FOIA documents relating to project LCPROWL (243 documents)
