= Lake Aschersleben =

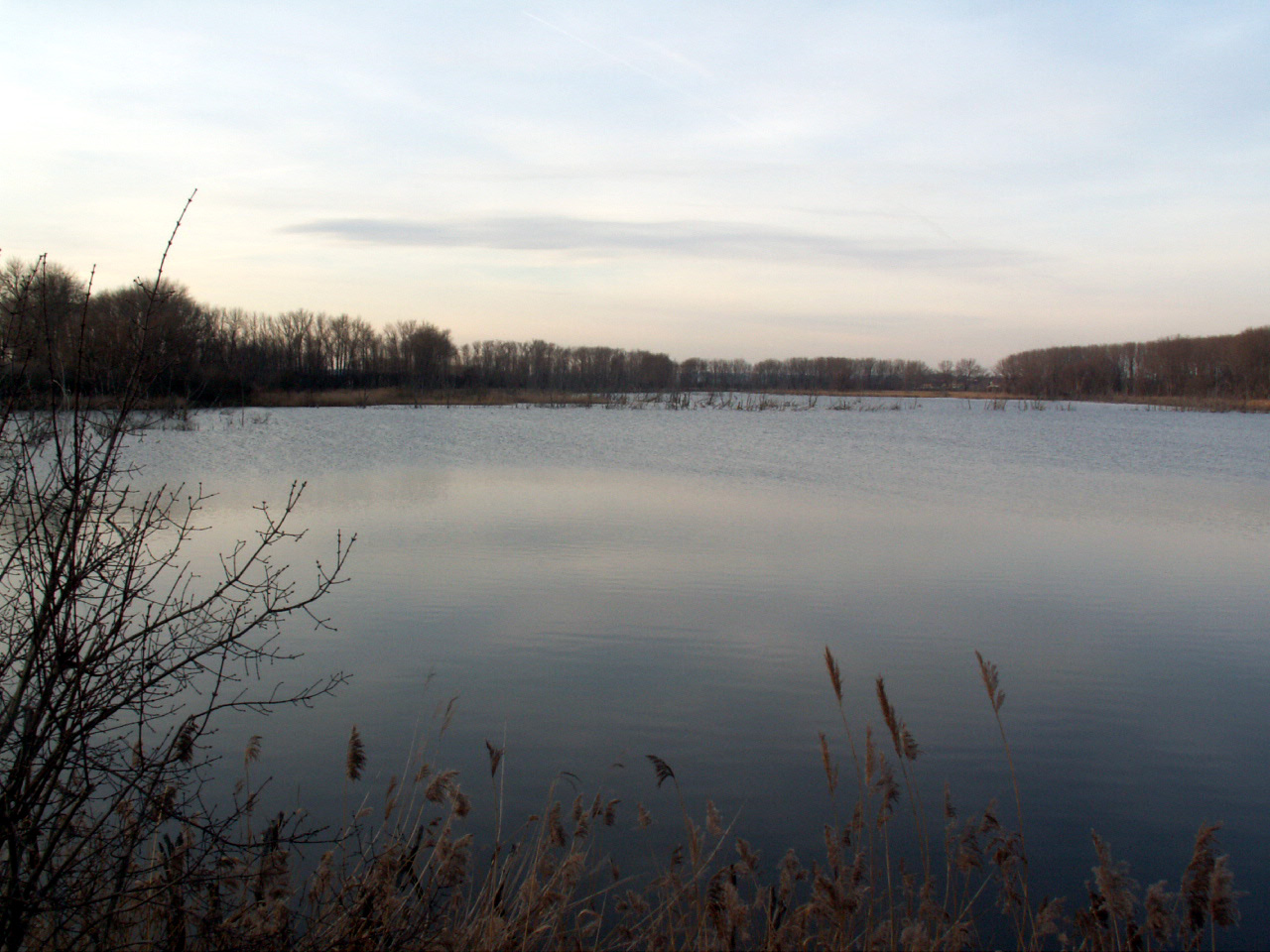

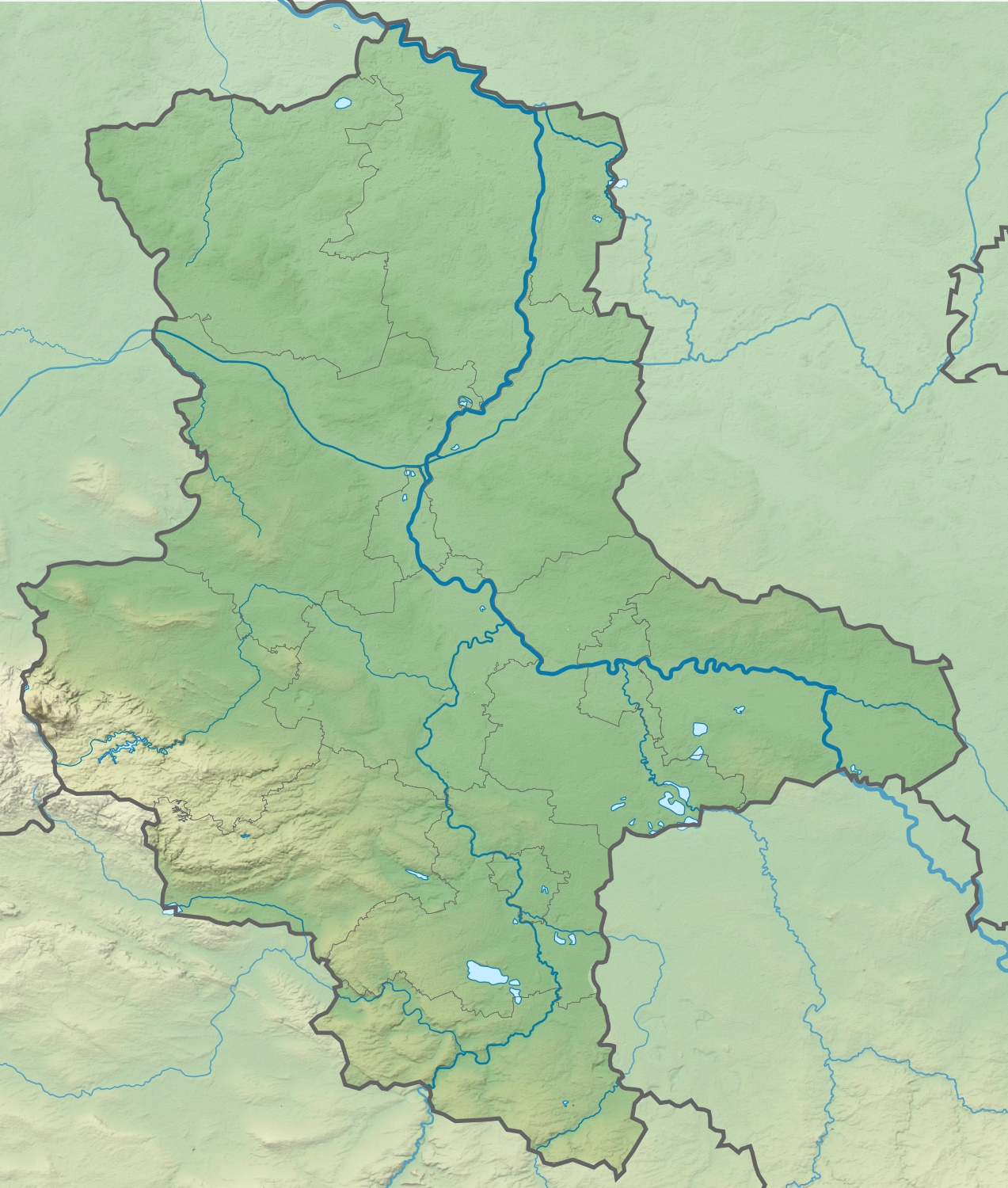
- Location within Saxony-Anhalt Location within Germany
- Location: Near Aschersleben, Germany
- Coordinates: 51°45′N 11°26′E
- Type: Former lake
- Primary inflows: Water diverted from the Selke River
- Primary outflows: Water returned to the Selke River
- Basin countries: Germany
- Max. length: 12 km (7.5 mi)
- Settlements: Aschersleben, Gatersleben

Lake Aschersleben or Lake Gatersleben (Ascherslebener See or Gaterslebener See in German) is a former long but shallow lake in Germany, northeast of the Harz Mountains. The lake was about 12 km long and stretched from the town of Aschersleben until the village of Gatersleben. Originally, it was a natural lake which eventually silted up. From the middle of the 15th until the beginning of the 18th century, it existed again as a man-made lake, afterwards the area was converted into agricultural land. Part of the land is now covered by several artificial lakes which formed as a consequence of underground and opencast lignite mining in the 20th century, the largest being the Concordiasee.

The lake had formed naturally and had attracted settlers in prehistoric times, but eventually silted up. In 1446, a dam was constructed near the village of Gatersleben on the order of the bishop of Halberstadt and water from the river Selke was diverted into the lakebed, leading to the restoration of the lake. By an order of Frederick I of Prussia, the lake was completely drained after 1703 and the lakebed was converted into agricultural land. Two new villages, Friedrichsaue and Königsaue, were founded.

The lakebed contains 20-25m thick Pleistocene and Holocene sediments, from the Eemian Stage (previous interglacial period) to the present. Fluviatile, limnic and periglacial sediments interchange. All in all, 11 sedimentation cycles are present.
