= Concordiasee =

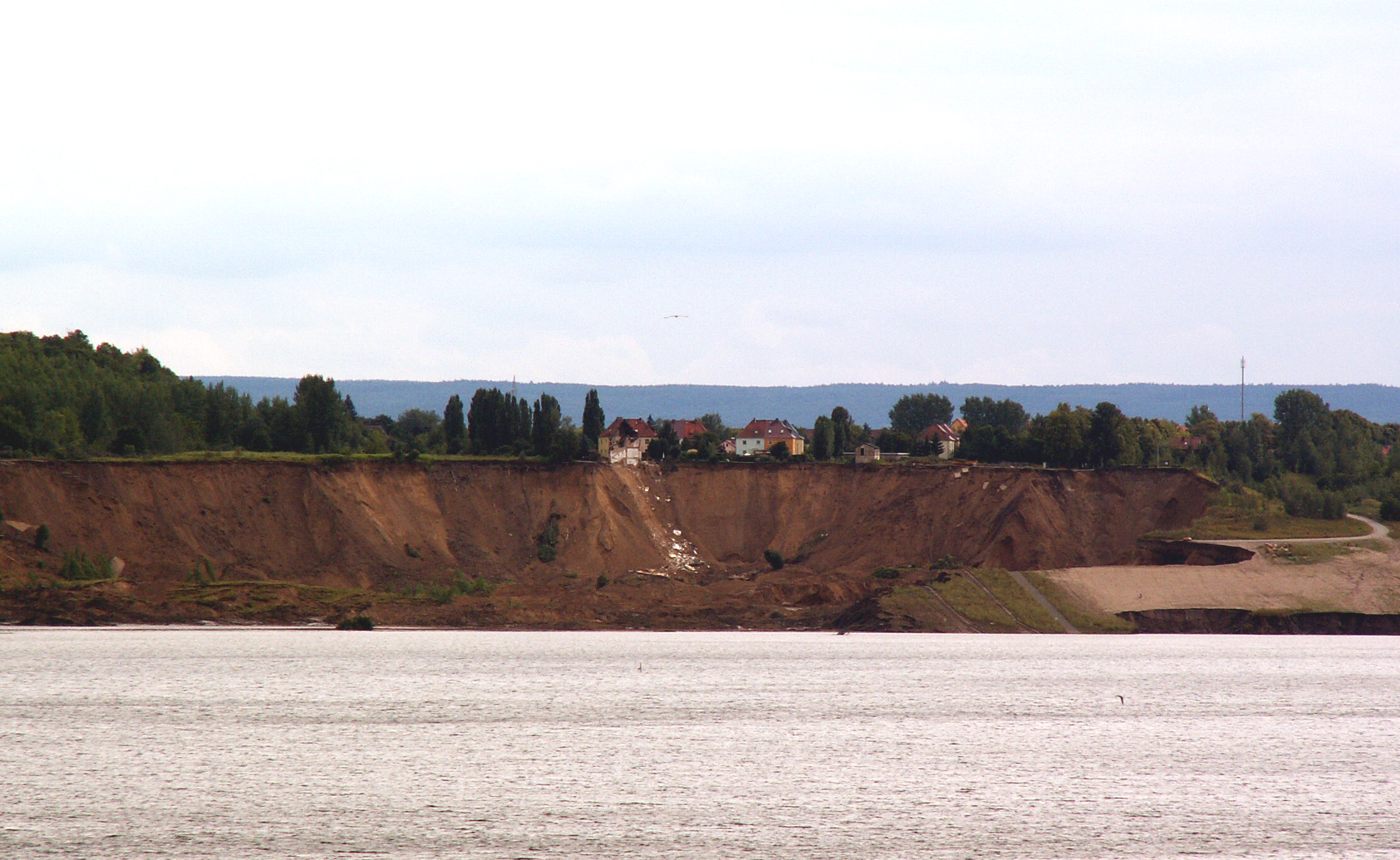

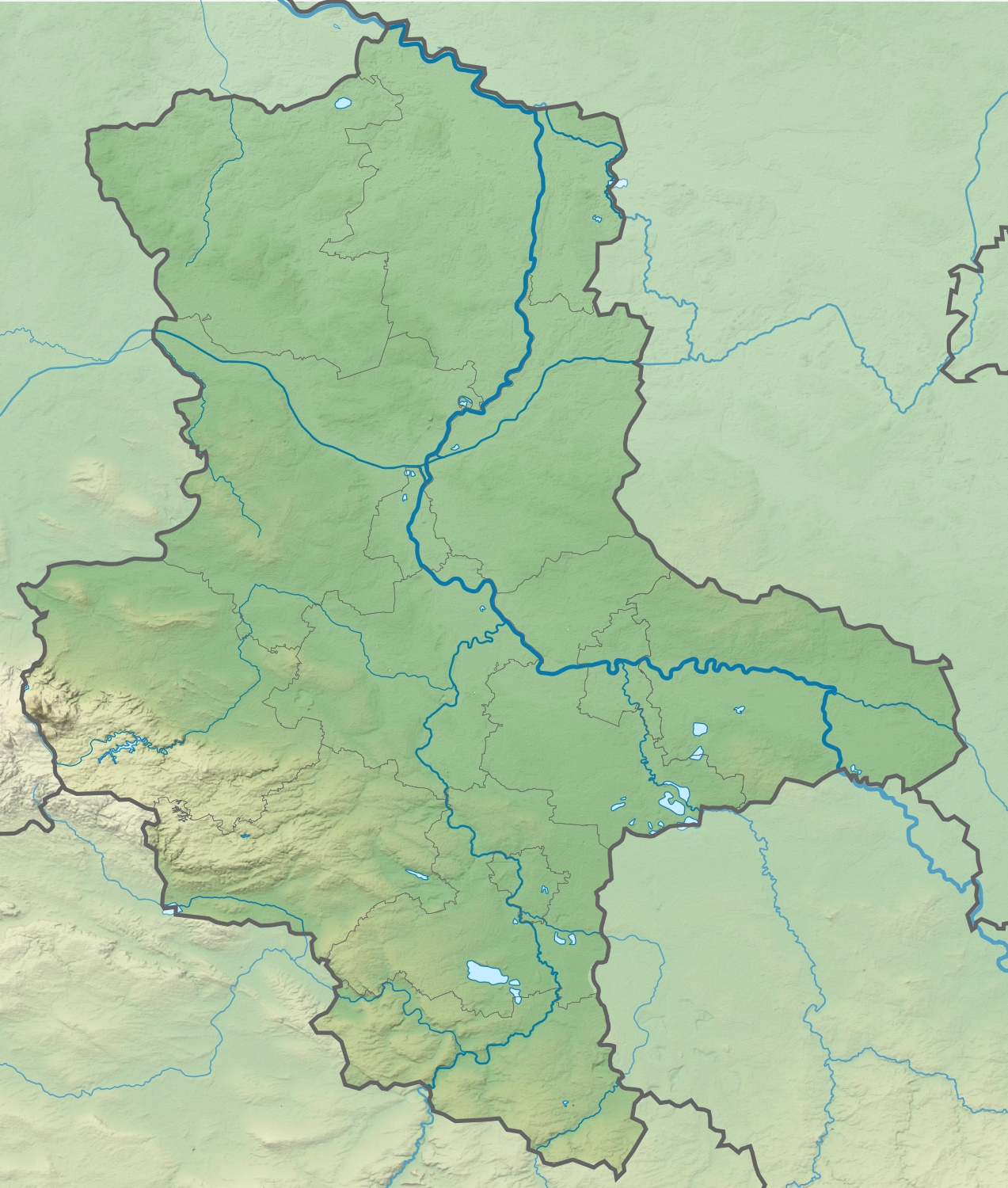
- Location within Saxony-Anhalt
- Location: Saxony-Anhalt
- Coordinates: 51°49′16″N 11°21′0″E
- Type: artificial lake
- Basin countries: Germany
- Max. length: 2.3 km (1.4 mi)
- Max. width: 1.1 km (0.68 mi)
- Surface area: 3.5 km^{2} (1.4 sq mi)
- Average depth: 29.5 metres (97 ft)
- Max. depth: 61 metres (200 ft)
- Water volume: 0.103 cubic kilometres (0.025 cu mi)
- Surface elevation: 103 metres (338 ft) above Normalhöhennull
- Settlements: Seeland, Germany

The Concordiasee (concordia being Latin for "harmony") is an artificial lake in Saxony-Anhalt, Germany. It is located about 8 kilometres (5.0 mi) northwest of Aschersleben.

== History ==
The name of the lake is derived from the former lignite mine in the area. Due to the flooding in 1996 of the former brown coal mine Nachterstedt, a multi-purpose lake was created as the centrepiece of an evolving mining landscape. In the summer of 2002, Concordiasee reached an area of about 300 hectares. With an opening ceremony on 17 August 2002, the lake was officially open for tourism. Since 25 May 2005 it operates a 250 passenger ship, the MS Seelandperle on the lake. In the summer of 2009 the lake was enlarged to 350 hectares. The maximum water level will be in 2015 when it will be expanded to an area of 650 hectares will be achieved. The maximum depth of the lake will then amount to 61 m.

=== Landslide ===
On 18 July 2009, at 4:40, a landslide occurred in an area by the lake leaving 3 people missing and making over 40 people homeless. The entire area within his immediate environment was shut off for a few days after it was declared a disaster area. The authorities ordered an investigation into the event.

The legal successor of the former operating company, the federal LMBV, has set up a supervisory office to overlook the event and since 22 July 2009 has accepted donations for the residents of the affected houses from all over Germany.
