= Königsaue =

Coordinates: 51°49′N 11°24′E

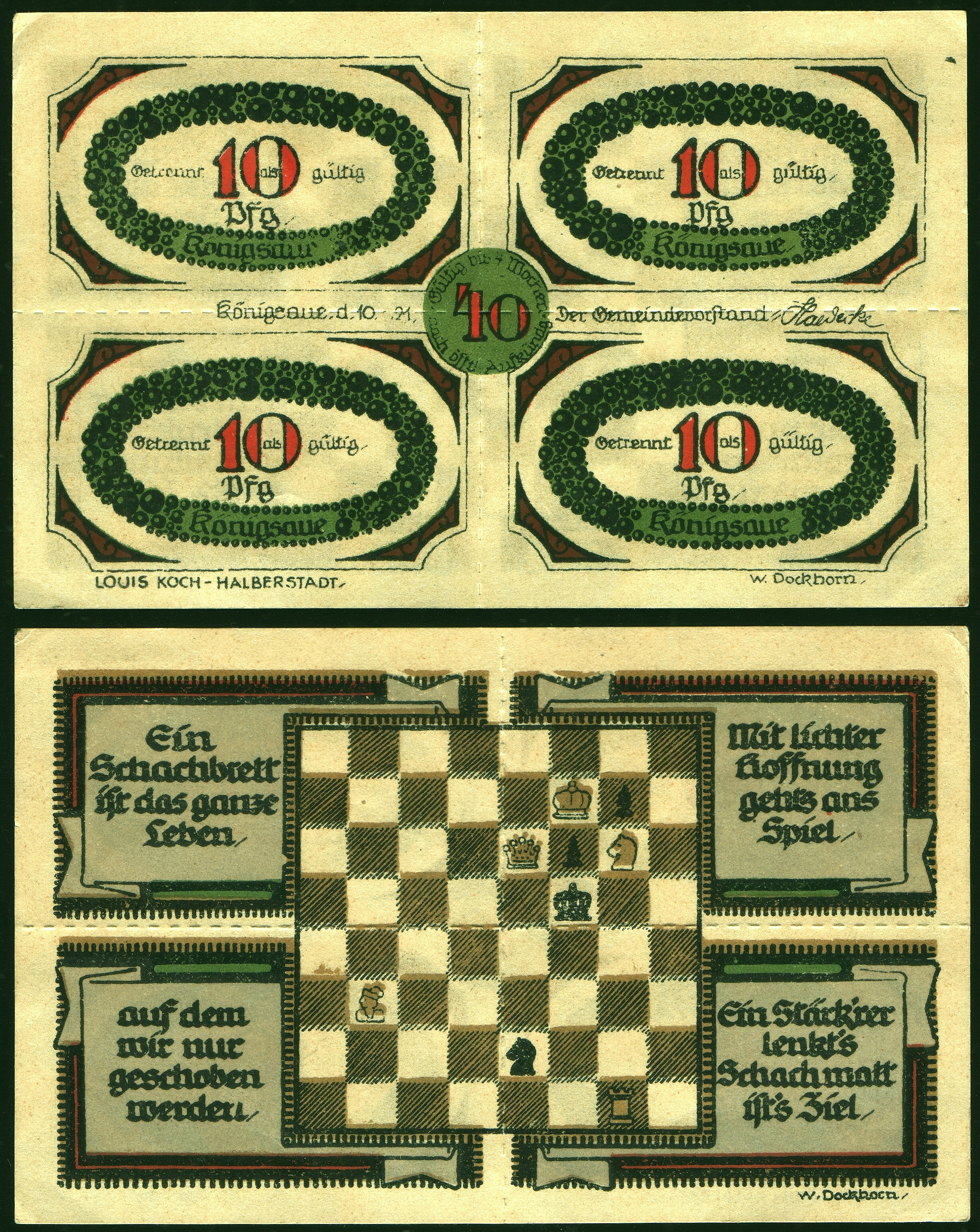
40 Pfennig Notgeld banknote (emergency money) from Königsaue, 1921

The town of Königsaue in the district Aschersleben-Staßfurt, Saxony-Anhalt, Germany was destroyed in the course of opencast lignite mining in 1964. The inhabitants were resettled to the town of Neu-Königsaue, ca. 1 km north of the former location.

== Palaeolithic site ==
Königsaue is also a middle palaeolithic find spot. It dates to about 80.000 BP, the Eemian (Ipswichian) interglacial. The site most probably was a seasonal hunting camp at the shore of lake Aschersleben that was completely drained at the beginning of the 18th century by an order of Friedrich II. It was discovered in 1963 by Dieter Mania during rescue excavations in the course of lignite mining (opencast mine Königsaue 1, 1918–1977) in a depth of 17 m.

== Stratigraphy ==
Three settlement layers can be distinguished, separated by limnic sediments. The first layer (A) is dated to the beginning of the interstadial. The vegetation is still turning to boreal, an open steppe type habitat, the pollen assemblage dominated by grasses. Layer C coincides with the climatic optimum. Tree pollen rise to 70%, birch and pine dominate.

== Finds ==
Ca. 6000 flints have been excavated, including a few bifacially worked knives (Keilmesser) and small pointed hand axes of Micoquien type (Faustkeilblätter). The bifacial tools are most common in layer A, while prepared cores are typical for layer B. Numerous unretouched blades and small debitage point to intense local tool production. The site may have been used as a base camp. In layer C bifacial tools again predominate. Layers A and C belong to the Micoquien, B to the Mousterian. Animal bones show that Mammoth, woolly haired rhino, horses, red deer and reindeer were hunted. Some pieces of worked wood have been preserved as well.

== Pitch ==
The most famous finds from Königsaue are two pieces of birch-pitch (layers A and B), one of which shows the partial finger-print of a Neanderthal. It shows the impression of a piece of wood as well and was thus used for hafting a composite tool. It is the oldest evidence for the use of chemical processes (dry destillation) up to now (=2004). The pieces are black, of a longish shape and show traces of kneading. Chemical analysis (gas-chromatography) confirm the identification as birch-pitch (presence of betulin).

	HK:63/150/0	HK64:1/0
length	2,3 cm	2,7 cm
breadth	1,4 cm	2,0 cm
thickness	0,6 cm	1,2 cm
weight	0,87 g	1,38 g
layer	B	A
date	43800±2100BP	48400±3700

The bigger piece shows impressions of a retouched stone artefact and of a split piece of wood, most probably a wooden haft of a bifacial tool. There are weak traces of finger-prints, but the whorl-pattern could not be identified.

=== Further reading ===
- Grünberg, Judith M.; Graetsch, Heribert; Baumer, Ursula; Koller, Johann (1999). "Untersuchung der mittelpaläolithischen "Harzreste" von Königsaue, Ldkr. Aschersleben-Staßfurt". Jahresschrift für mitteldeutsche Vorgeschichte (in German). 81: 7–38. doi:10.11588/jsmv.1999.1.84040. ISSN 2626-4234.
- J. Koller/U. Baumer/D. Mania, Pitch in the Palaeolithic - Investigations of the Middle Palaeolithic "resin remains" from Königsaue. In: G. A. Wagner/D. Mania (eds.), Frühe Menschen in Mitteleuropa - Chronologie, Kultur, Umwelt (Aachen 2001) 99-112.
- Johann Koller/Ursula Brauner/Dietrich Mania, High-Tech in the middle Palaeolithic: Neanderthal manufactured pitch identified. European Journal of Archaeology 4/3, 2001, 385-397.
- J.M.Grünberg, Middle Palaeolithic birch-bark pitch. Antiquity 76, 2002, 15-16
- Harald Meller (ed.), Geisteskraft. Alt- und Mittelpaläolithikum (Halle 2003). (general catalogue of Palaeolithic finds in Saxony-Anhalt and Thuringia).
