= Bautzen II =

Prison in Germany

Coordinates: 51.1779°N 14.4364°E

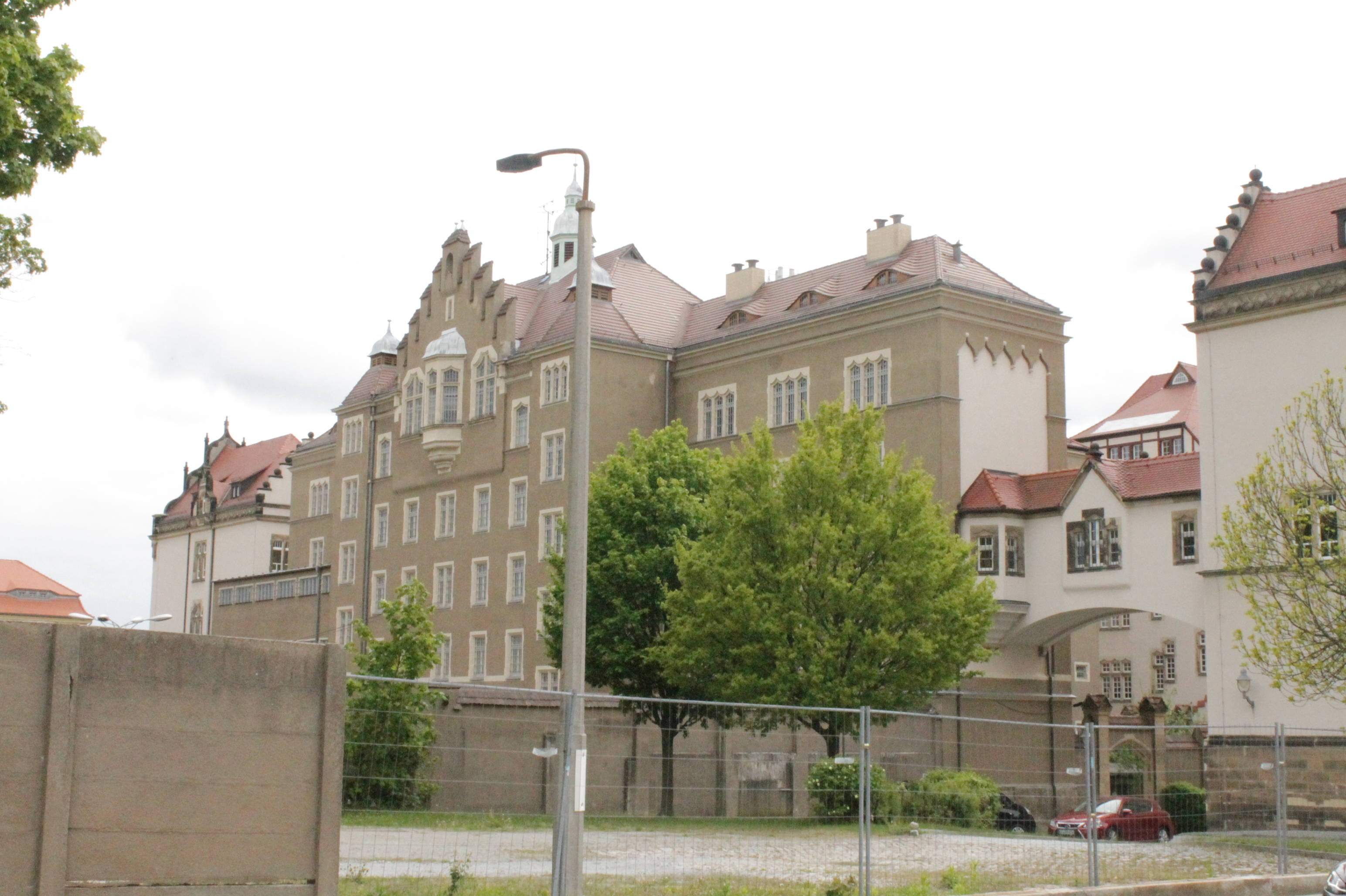
Bautzen II as seen from the north-west

Bautzen II was a 20th century political prison in the town of Bautzen in Saxony operational during the communist regime in East Germany. It was the only East German prison directly under the control of the Stasi.

It now stands as an open-air museum and memorial to its harsh history, entered at no charge.

== History ==
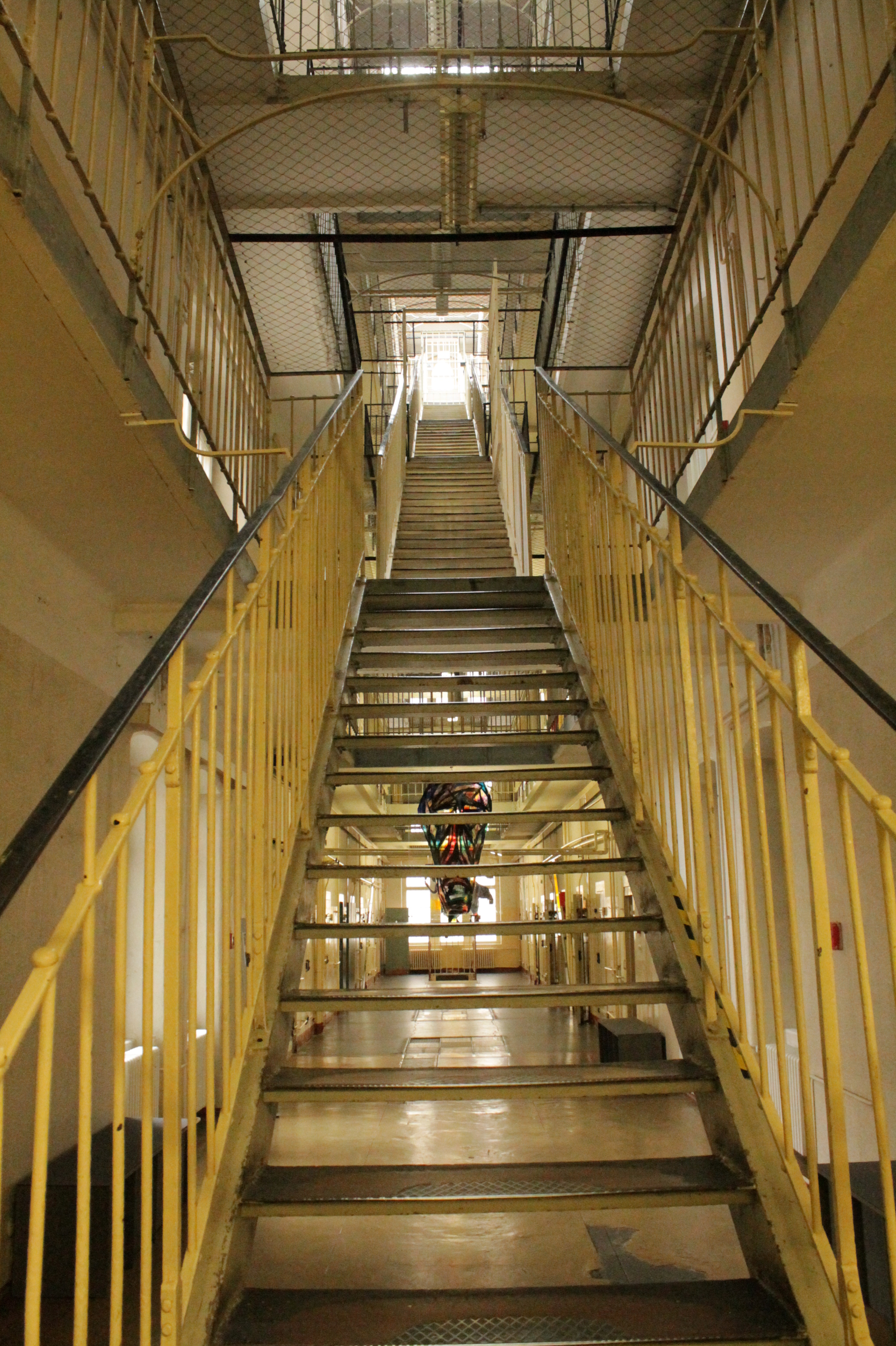
The central stairs in Bautzen II

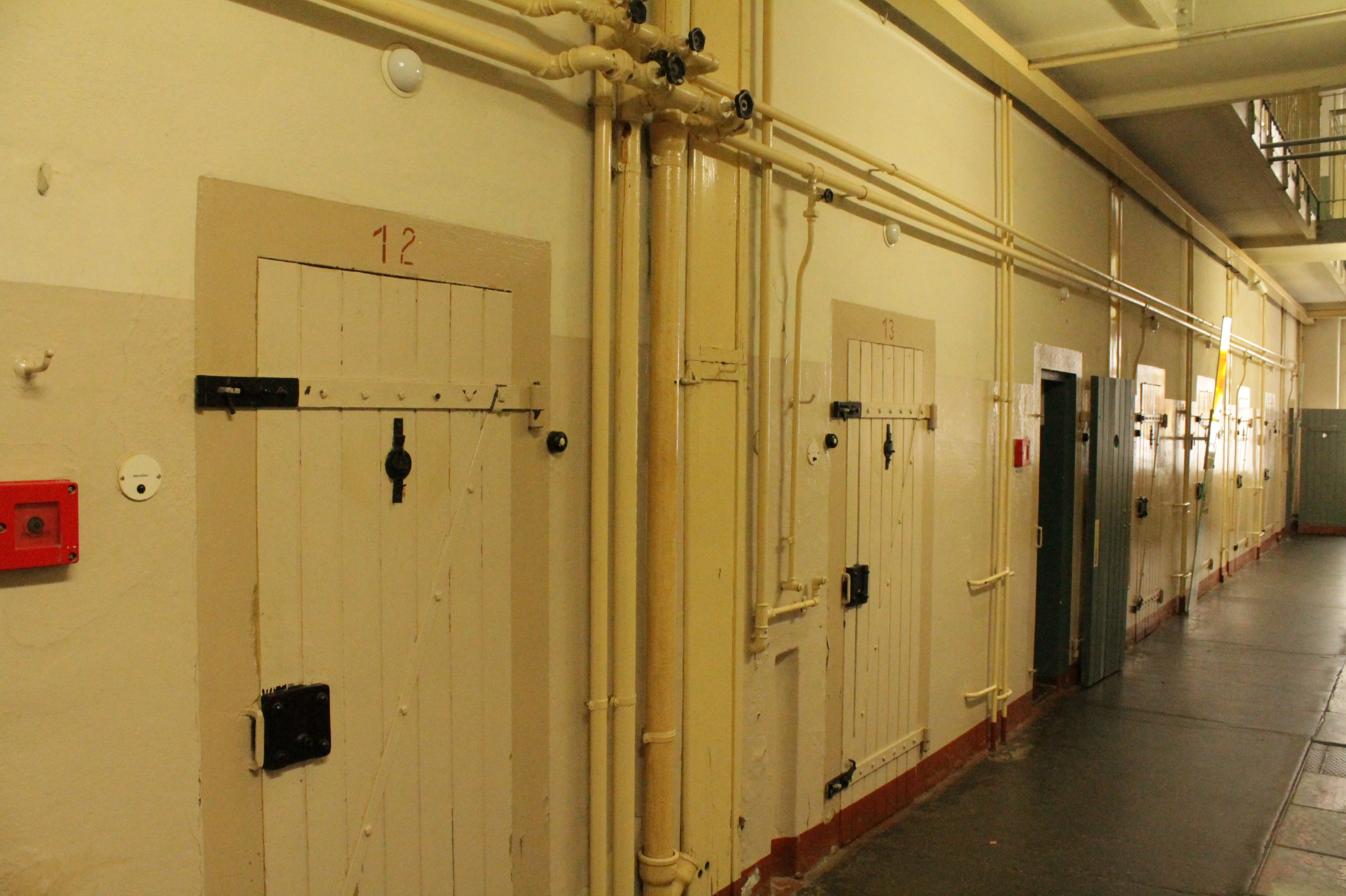
Cells in Bautzen II

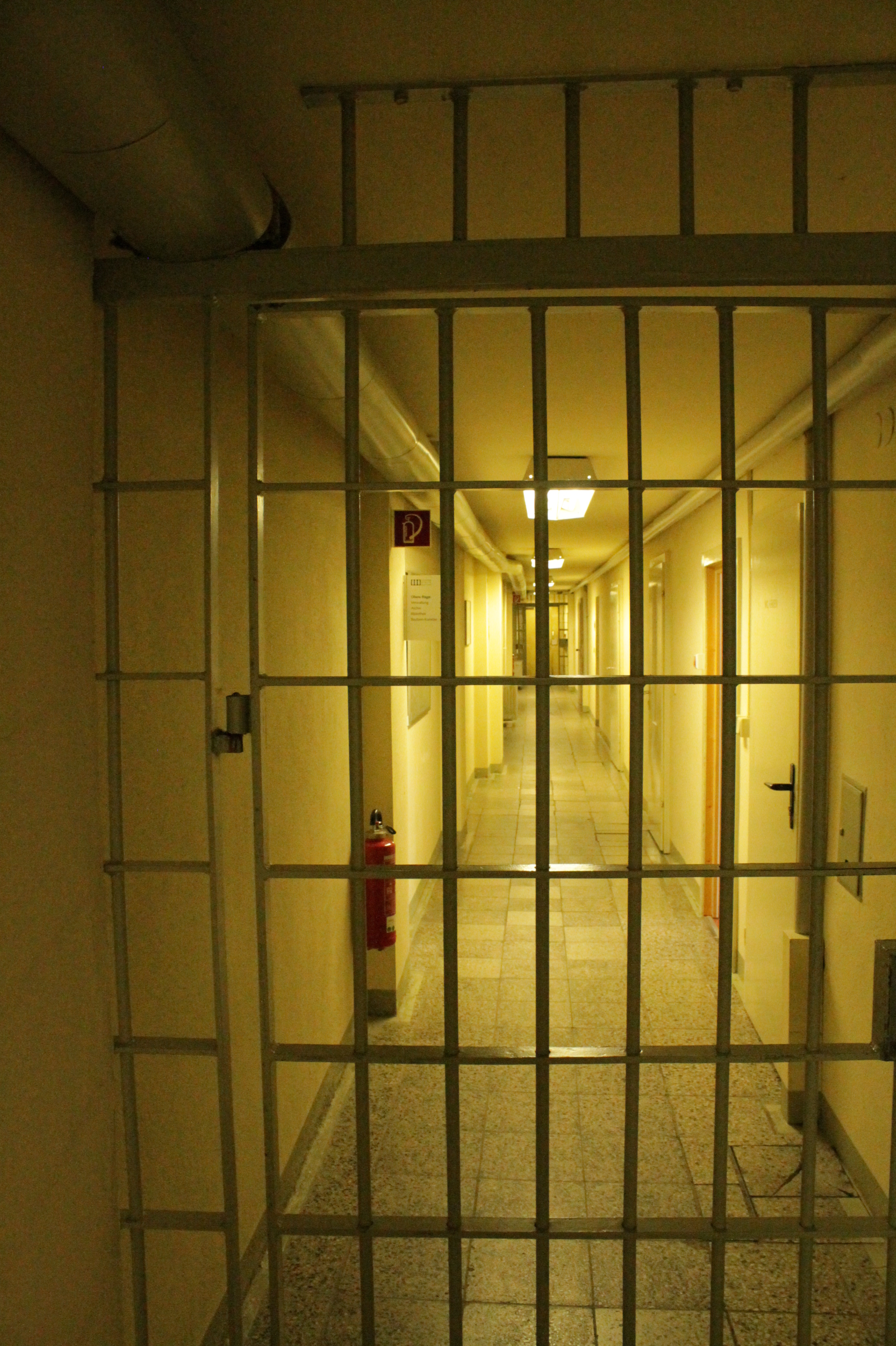
Ground floor corridor, Bautzen II

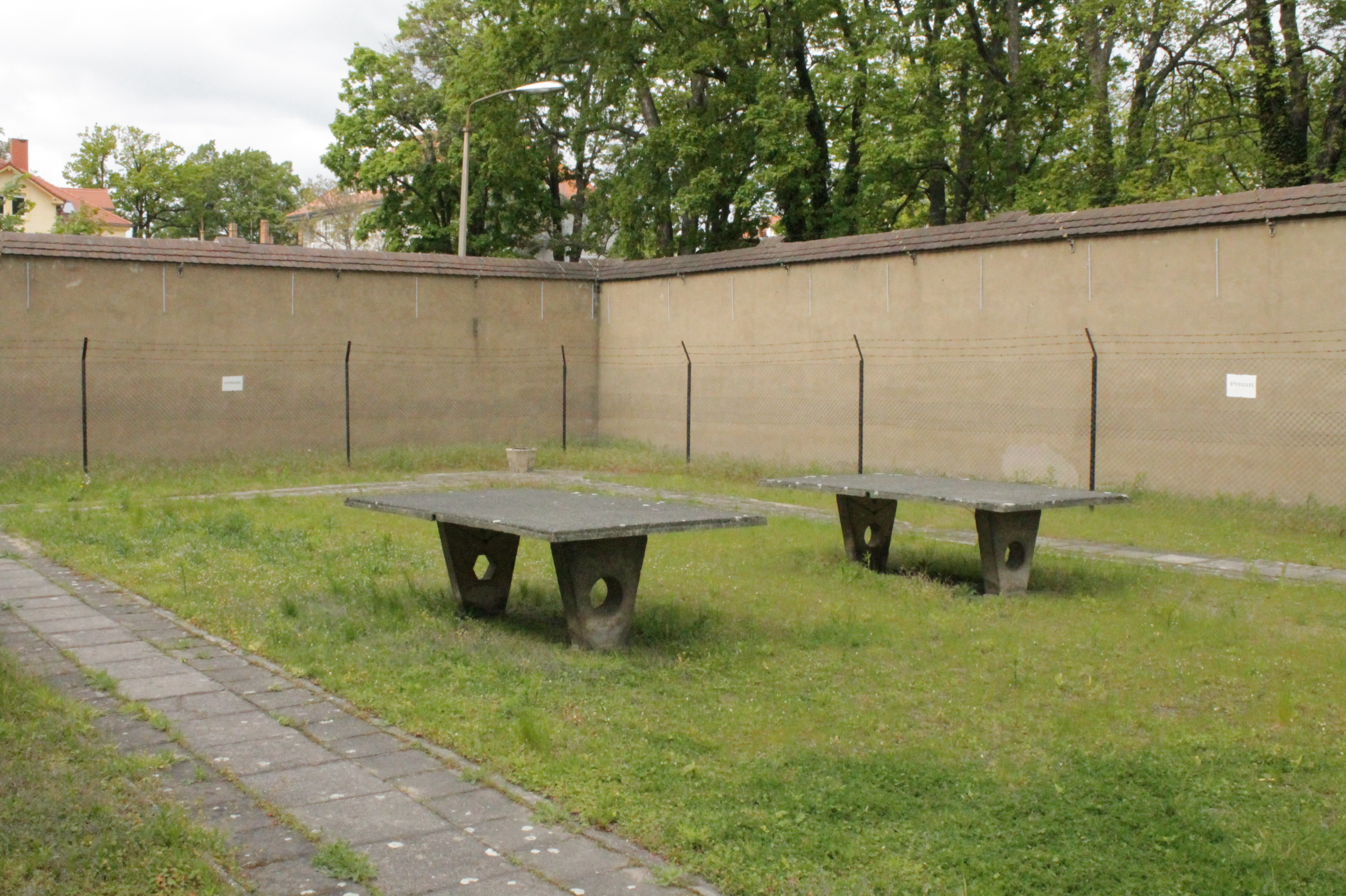
Exercise yard at Bautzen II including concrete table tennis tables

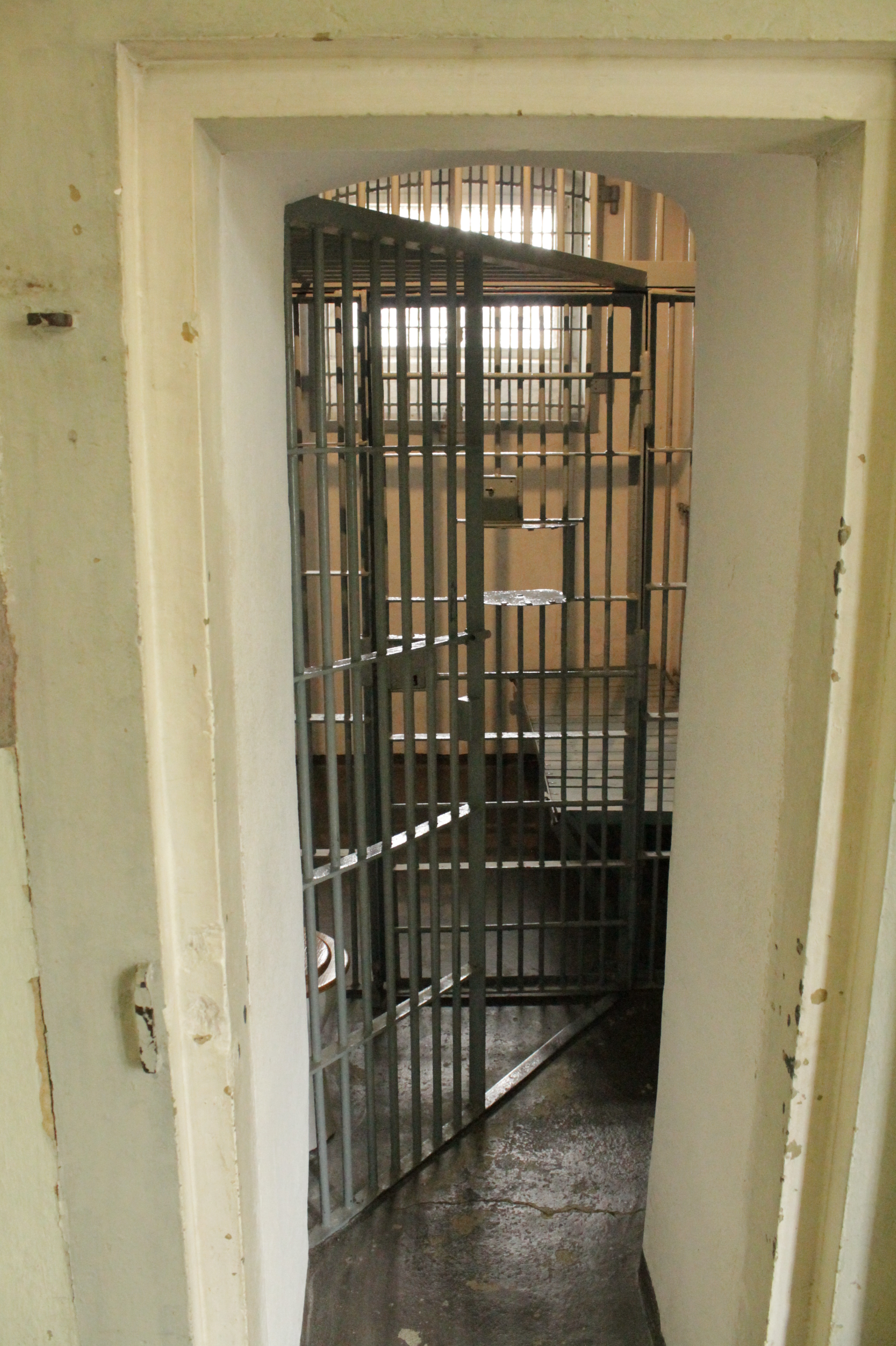
One of the punishment cells, Bautzen II

The history of the prison may be divided into four broad phases:

- court prison
- prison under Nazi regime
- prison during communist period
- present day museum

=== Court prison ===
The building was built in 1906. It was relatively advanced for the time having electric lighting throughout and steam air heating.

From 1906 to 1933 the building served as a relatively commonplace prison linked to the encircling police headquarters and courtrooms to the south on Lessingstrasse. The building had 157 cells holding up to 203 prisoners (most cells being single occupancy). Occupancy was general short pretrial periods and shorter sentences for lesser crimes at post-trial.

Due to a general under-occupancy, the prison was shared with captured prisoners-of-war from 1916 to 1918.

From 1923 to 1933, due to reforms in the Weimar Republic the prison went through its most lenient period.

=== Nazi regime ===
When the Nazis came to power in 1933 Bautzen became a place where political prisoners, especially those with communist views, were imprisoned. From 1939 resistance fighters captured in other countries were placed in Bautzen II.

=== Communist regime ===
The fall of the Nazis in 1945 did not bring improvement to Bautzen. Although all communist sympathisers were released, the overall role as a political prison continued.

From 1945 to 1949 it was run by the Soviet Secret Police. This period was the prison's most crowded, with up to 400 prisoners in the space designed for 200.

From 1949 the prison was run by the Saxony Judiciary. After a period of re-organisation, it was used as a detention centre from 1951 to 1956. However, in 1956 it passed to the newly created Ministry of State Security (Stasi). The nature of imprisonment changed radically and punishments became unusually harsh. People aiding escape to the West were regularly sentenced to 15 years, a harsh punishment designed as a strong deterrent. Overall numbers grew further, peaking at 260 in 1962. During this period Amnesty International became involved both in prison conditions and the nature of those imprisoned.

From 1963 one wing on the first floor housed female political prisoners (up to 19).

Only one escape is known: Dieter Hötger in 1967. He was recaptured nine days later.

=== Museum ===
Political prisoners were released in 1989 very soon after the reunification of Germany. From 1989 a small number of petty criminals (a maximum of 23) were still held in the prison, but in January 1992 it closed as a prison completely.

After some discussion it was decided to retain the prison in its entirety as a memorial and free museum. It is accessed from the north-east, as the police headquarters and law courts remain operational to south, east, and west. It opened as a museum in 1993. Most of the building is preserved untouched. Some of the larger rooms contain exhibits explaining the history of the building, some of the prisoners, and some of the guards. The exercise yards are only accessible by special request.

There is no fee to visit. Volunteers offer some information. The outer buildings contain a self-service cafe and a display of East German prison transport.

The prison is accessed from the north off Weigangstrasse.

== Karnickelberg graveyard ==
A graveyard for prisoners who died of illness or from beatings lies on Talstrasse in northern Bautzen, close to Bautzen I (the 'Yellow Misery'). This mainly represents deaths during the Soviet period 1945 to 1949.

The area was formally opened as a public-access area in 1990, with information boards were added. A memorial chapel was erected in 2000, which provides more information on the victims and shelter for visitors.

== Notable prisoners ==
- Rudolf Bahro
- Helmut Brandt
- Herbert Crüger
- Georg Dertinger
- Julius Fučík
- Karl Wilhelm Fricke
- Wolfgang Harich
- Walter Janka
- Gustav Just
- Erich Loest
- Otto Maercker
- Armin Raufeisen
- Hannes Sieberer
- Kurt Vieweg
- Heinz Zöger
- Peter Gross

Source Haase & Müller (2003).
