= Hoym =

- Stadtteil of Seeland
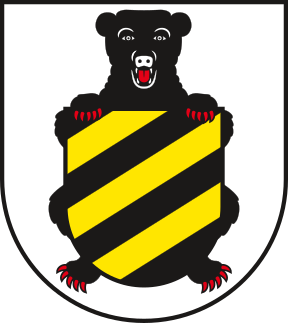
- Coat of arms
- Interactive map of Hoym
- Location within Germany Location within Saxony-Anhalt
- Coordinates: 51°47′N 11°18′E
- Country: Germany
- State: Saxony-Anhalt
- District: Salzlandkreis
- Town: Seeland

Area
  - Total: 20.27 km^{2} (7.83 sq mi)
- Elevation: 131 m (430 ft)

Population (2011)
  - Total: 2,450
  - Density: 121/km^{2} (313/sq mi)
- Time zone: UTC+01:00 (CET)
  - Summer (DST): UTC+02:00 (CEST)
- Postal codes: 06467
- Dialling codes: 034741

Hoym (German pronunciation: [hɔʏm]) is a town and former municipality in the district of Salzlandkreis in the German state of Saxony-Anhalt. Since 15 July 2009, it is part of the town Seeland. Hoym is located on the river Selke, between the towns Aschersleben and Quedlinburg. One of the main features of the town is Schloss Hoym, which is used as a home for the mentally handicapped. Hoym is part of the Verwaltungsgemeinschaft ("collective municipality") Seeland, district Salzlandkreis. Olympian Burckhardt Hoppe was born here.

== People ==
- Karl Wilhelm Fricke (born 1929), journalist
