= Frose =

- Stadtteil of Seeland
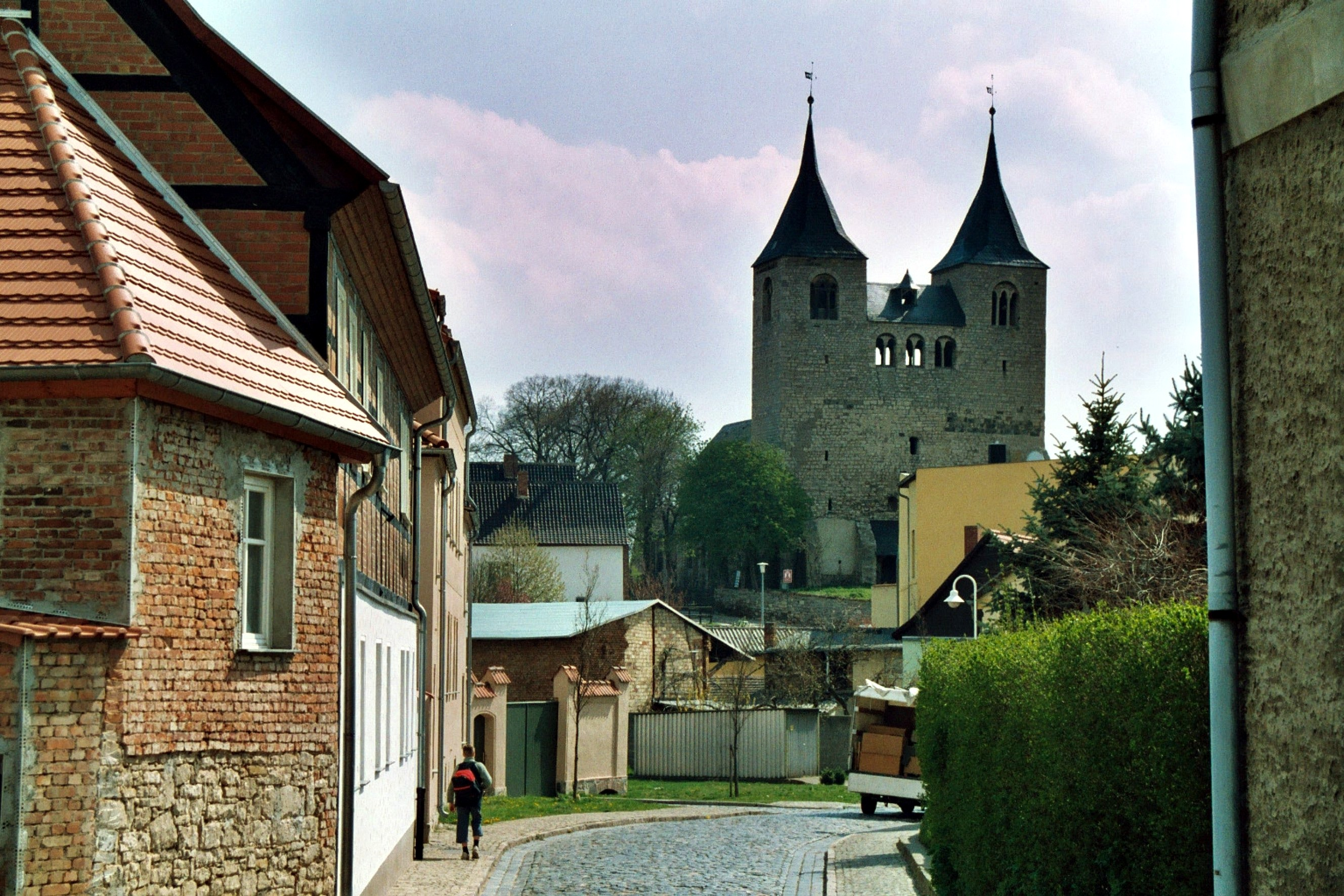
- The view to the abbey church in Frose

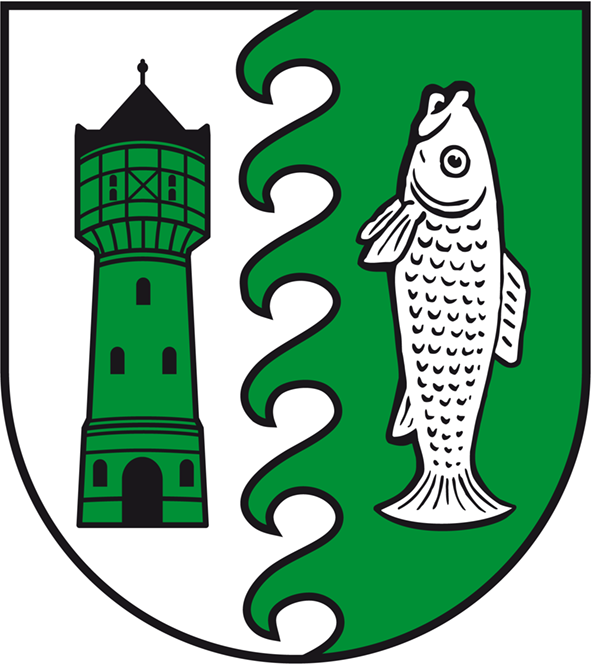
- Coat of arms
- Interactive map of Frose
- Location within Germany Location within Saxony-Anhalt
- Coordinates: 51°47′N 11°22′E
- Country: Germany
- State: Saxony-Anhalt
- District: Salzlandkreis
- Town: Seeland

Area
  - Total: 12.78 km^{2} (4.93 sq mi)
- Elevation: 105 m (344 ft)

Population (2006-12-31)
  - Total: 1,518
  - Density: 118.8/km^{2} (307.6/sq mi)
- Time zone: UTC+01:00 (CET)
  - Summer (DST): UTC+02:00 (CEST)
- Postal codes: 06464
- Dialling codes: 034741
- Vehicle registration: SLK

Frose is a village and a former municipality in the district of Salzlandkreis, in Saxony-Anhalt, Germany. Since 15 July 2009, it is part of the town Seeland.
