= Nachterstedt =

- Stadtteil of Seeland
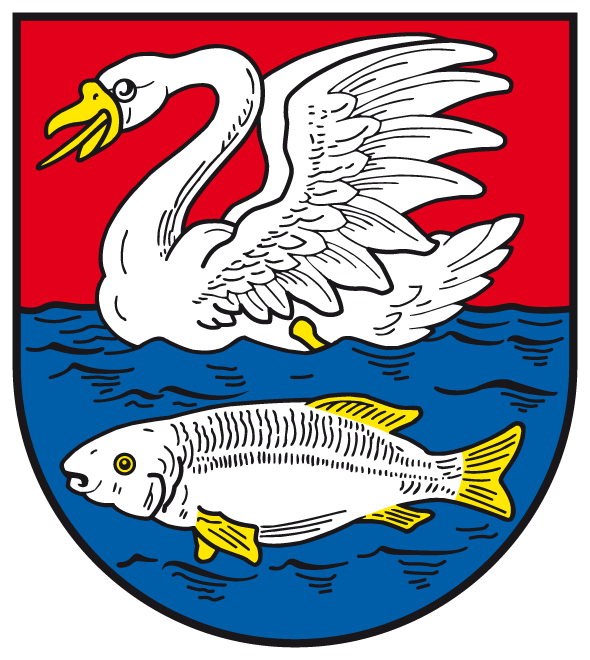
- Coat of arms
- Interactive map of Nachterstedt
- Location within Germany Location within Saxony-Anhalt
- Coordinates: 51°48′8″N 11°20′7″E
- Country: Germany
- State: Saxony-Anhalt
- District: Salzlandkreis
- Town: Seeland

Area
  - Total: 8.21 km^{2} (3.17 sq mi)
- Elevation: 94 m (308 ft)

Population (2006-12-31)
  - Total: 2,155
  - Density: 262/km^{2} (680/sq mi)
- Time zone: UTC+01:00 (CET)
  - Summer (DST): UTC+02:00 (CEST)
- Postal codes: 06469
- Dialling codes: 034741
- Vehicle registration: SLK

Nachterstedt is a village and a former municipality in the district of Salzlandkreis, in Saxony-Anhalt, Germany. Since 15 July 2009, it is part of the town Seeland.

== 2009 Landslide ==
On 18 July 2009 a 350-metre long part of the bank of the nearby artificial Concordia lake slid into the water. Two houses were located on the area which ended up in the lake and three inhabitants got buried and were declared lost.

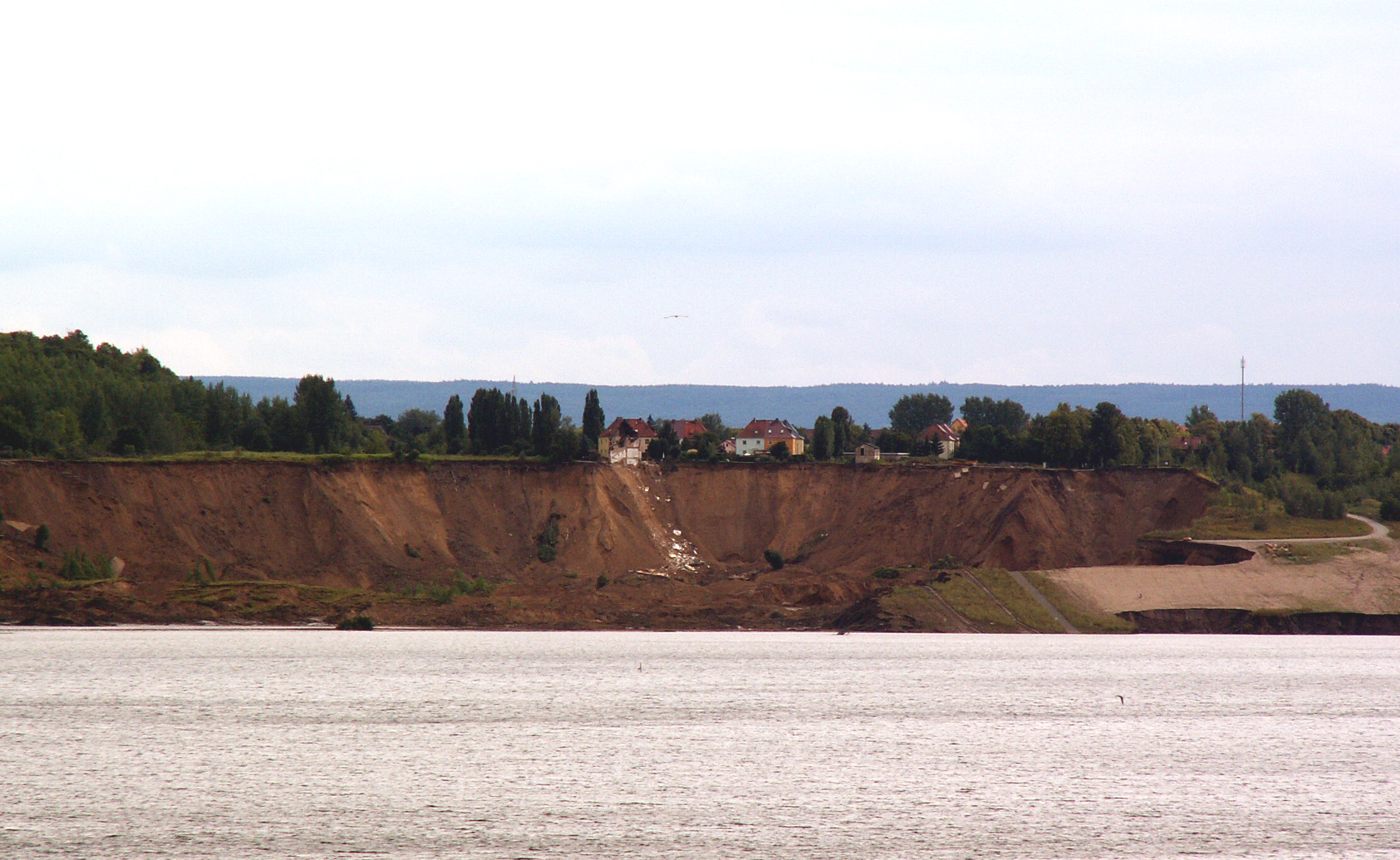
Landslide in Nachterstedt July 2009
