= Seeland, Germany =

Seeland
- Town
- Coat of arms

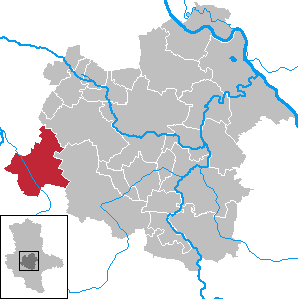
- Location of Seeland within Salzlandkreis district
- Interactive map of Seeland
- Location within Germany Location within Saxony-Anhalt
- Coordinates: 51°48′N 11°20′E
- Country: Germany
- State: Saxony-Anhalt
- District: Salzlandkreis

Government
  - Mayor (2023–30): Robert Käsebier

Area
  - Total: 78.86 km^{2} (30.45 sq mi)
- Elevation: 131 m (430 ft)

Population (2025-12-31)
  - Total: 7,420
  - Density: 94.1/km^{2} (244/sq mi)
- Time zone: UTC+01:00 (CET)
  - Summer (DST): UTC+02:00 (CEST)
- Postal codes: 06449, 06464, 06467
- Dialling codes: 034741
- Vehicle registration: SLK, ASL

Seeland (German pronunciation: [ˈzeːlant], lit. 'Lakeland') is a town in the Salzlandkreis district, in Saxony-Anhalt, Germany. It is situated northwest of Aschersleben. It was formed by the merger of the previously independent municipalities Friedrichsaue, Frose, Hoym, Nachterstedt and Schadeleben on 15 July 2009. Before this date, these municipalities cooperated in the Verwaltungsgemeinschaft ("collective municipality") Seeland, which also contained the municipality Gatersleben. Gatersleben joined Seeland in September 2010.
