= Gatersleben =

- Stadtteil of Seeland
- Interactive map of Gatersleben
- Location within Germany Location within Saxony-Anhalt
- Coordinates: 51°49′N 11°16′E
- Country: Germany
- State: Saxony-Anhalt
- District: Salzlandkreis
- Town: Seeland

Area
  - Total: 16.00 km^{2} (6.18 sq mi)
- Elevation: 110 m (360 ft)

Population (2009-12-31)
  - Total: 2,272
  - Density: 142.0/km^{2} (367.8/sq mi)
- Time zone: UTC+01:00 (CET)
  - Summer (DST): UTC+02:00 (CEST)
- Postal codes: 06466
- Dialling codes: 039482
- Vehicle registration: SLK
- Website: www.gatersleben.info

Gatersleben (German pronunciation: [ˈɡaːtɐsleːbm̩]) is a village and a former municipality in the district Salzlandkreis, in Saxony-Anhalt, Germany. Since 1 September 2010, it has been part of the town of Seeland. It is situated southwest of Magdeburg and northwest of Halle (Saale).

== Economy ==
Agriculture and Biotechnology are the two major focus areas to promote economic development in and around the village. The Biotechpark Gatersleben, developed at the initiative of the State of Saxony-Anhalt, provides space for growing biotech companies. The Leibniz-Institute of Plant Genetics and Crop Plant Research IPK (https://www.ipk-gatersleben.de]), Gatersleben, is a nonprofit research institution for crop genetics and molecular biology and is part of the Leibniz Association.

At present, Gatersleben is rapidly becoming a center for “green” biotechnology. The establishment of SunGene, a plant biotechnology company and subsidiary of the BASF group, provided the principal impetus in 1998. Today, SunGene is a part of the BASF Plant Science organisation and has more than 60 employees and an ideal research environment in a modern laboratory building. Three other biotech firms, hived off from the IPK, work in a business centre completed in autumn 2000: TraitGenetics, Novoplant, and ArrayOn. Plantalytics GmbH, a small service company for photosynthetic metering, also operates on the campus.

Due to major structural problems in Saxony-Anhalt, such as a high rate of unemployment, Gatersleben, with its biotech-park, is of great importance to developing that area.

== G-Life ==
Gatersleben combines rural village life in the plains of the Harz with an international community, creating a culture known as G-Life. The internationally known Leibniz-Institute of Plant Genetics and Crop Plant Research, IPK (https://www.ipk-gatersleben.de), together with the associated biotechnology companies, attract a diverse community from around Germany, Europe, and the world.

== Transport ==
The major local modes of transport are buses and trains. The fares depend on the distance and region of travel.

The village occasionally has buses operated by QBUS that link to other towns and villages.

Both the national Deutsche Bahn DB regional train service and the local Harz Elbe Express (HEX Online) provide service to Gatersleben. The train service connects Halle to the southeast, and to the northwest, the HEX makes connections through Halberstadt, while the regional service from DB connects through Hannover. The nearest airport is Magdeburg-Cochstedt Airport, located only 7 km from the village. The nearest major airport is Leipzig/Halle Airport, located around 90 km south of the village.

== In and around the village ==
Gatersleben is a small village with a traditional restaurant/pub, a bank, a post office, a supermarket, a hardware store, and a drugstore.

The landscape of the village can be visited in different seasons. Communities like Wernigerode, Quedlinburg, etc. surround Gatersleben.
