= Friedrichsaue =

- Stadtteil of Seeland
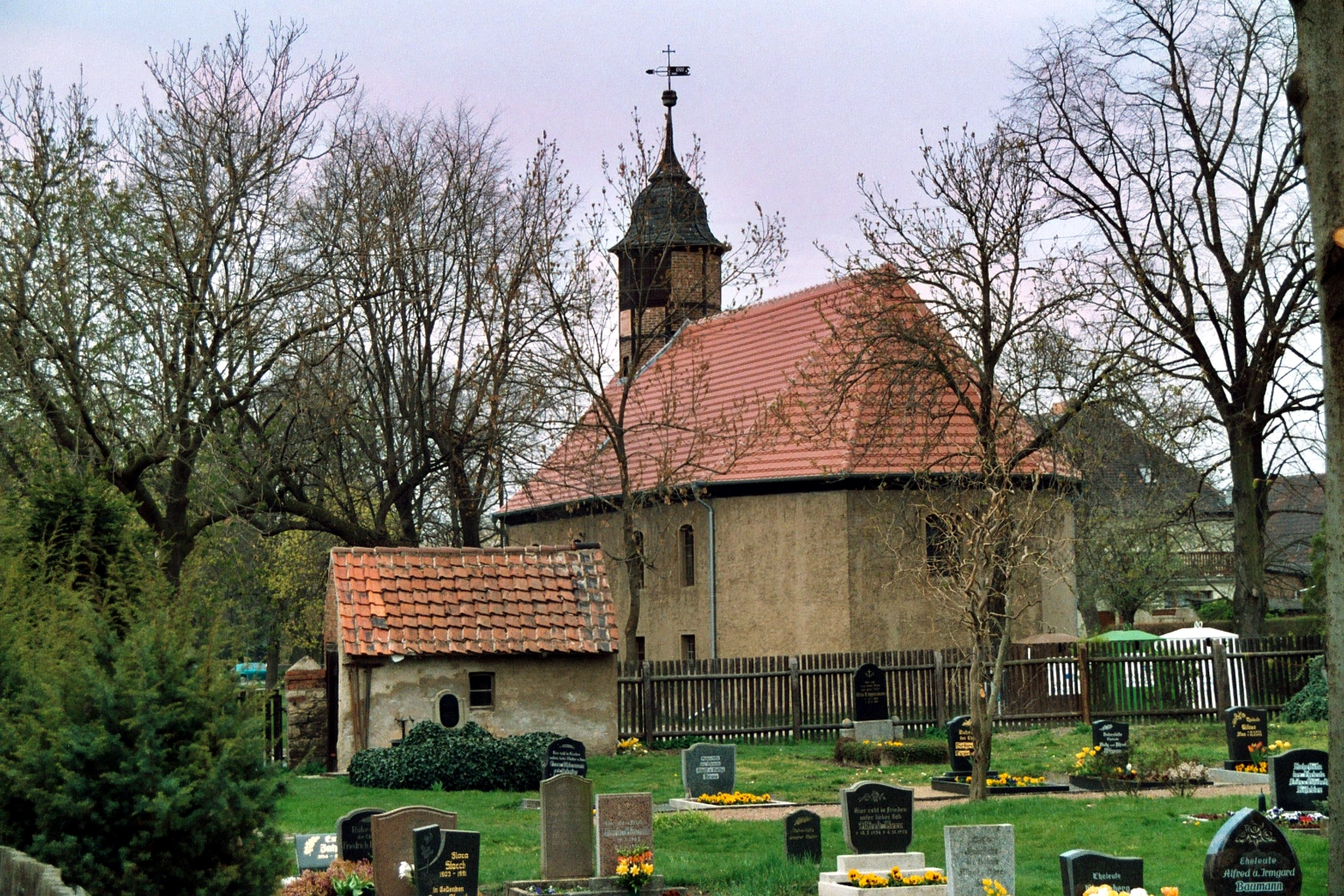
- The village church of Friedrichsaue
- Interactive map of Friedrichsaue
- Location within Germany Location within Saxony-Anhalt
- Coordinates: 51°50′10″N 11°19′53″E
- Country: Germany
- State: Saxony-Anhalt
- District: Salzlandkreis
- Town: Seeland

Area
  - Total: 4.44 km^{2} (1.71 sq mi)
- Elevation: 105 m (344 ft)

Population (2006-12-31)
  - Total: 200
  - Density: 45/km^{2} (120/sq mi)
- Time zone: UTC+01:00 (CET)
  - Summer (DST): UTC+02:00 (CEST)
- Postal codes: 06449
- Dialling codes: 034741
- Vehicle registration: SLK
- Website: www.friedrichsaue-am-see.de

Friedrichsaue is a village and a former municipality in the district of Salzlandkreis, in Saxony-Anhalt, Germany. Since 15 July 2009, it is part of the town Seeland.

== Geography ==
The village lies approximately 18 km north-west of Aschersleben. The population, (as of June 2004), is 224 inhabitants, making it one of the smallest villages in the region.

== History ==
Friedrichsaue was founded in 1753, named after Frederick the Great. He gifted lands nearby to migrants from the Rhineland who founded the religious settlement Klostergut Seeleben.

The village was formerly part of the Aschersleben-Staßfurt-Kreis, which changed to Salzlandkreis on 1 July 2007, as part of the Kreisreform Sachsen-Anhalt 2007.
