= Law degree =

Academic degree conferred for studies in law

A law degree is an academic degree conferred for studies in law.

Some law degrees are professional degrees that are prerequisites or serve as preparation for legal careers. These generally include the Bachelor of Civil Law, Bachelor of Laws, and Juris Doctor. Law degrees that are not part of a professional pathway to legal practice include the Master of Laws (LLM) and Doctor of Laws (LLD or JSD).

These degrees are usually obtained through a combination of coursework, research, and practical experiences, such as internships or clinical legal education. Law degrees are recognized as a necessary step towards becoming a licensed lawyer in many jurisdictions, and they also provide a foundation for various other career paths such as academia, policy, or consultancy.

== List of common degrees ==
- Bachelor of Laws (LLB)
- Master of Laws (LLM)
- Doctor of Laws (LLD)
- Juris Doctor (JD)
- Doctor of Juridical Science (SJD)
- Doctor of Philosophy (PhD)
- Master of Studies in Law (MSL)
- Bachelor of Civil Law (BCL)

== History ==
The first academic degrees were law degrees, and the first law degrees were doctorates. The foundations of the first universities in Europe were the glossators of the 11th century, which were schools of law. The first European university, Bologna, was founded by four legal scholars in the 12th century. The first academic title of "doctor" applied to scholars of law. The degree and title were not applied to scholars of other disciplines until the 13th century.

The University of Bologna served as the model for other law schools of the medieval age. While it was common for students of law to visit and study at schools in other countries, that was not the case with England. This was because of the English rejection of Roman law. Although the University of Oxford and University of Cambridge did teach canon law up until the English Reformation, its importance was always superior to civil law in those institutions.

=== Types of degrees ===
The type of law degree conferred differs according to the jurisdiction.

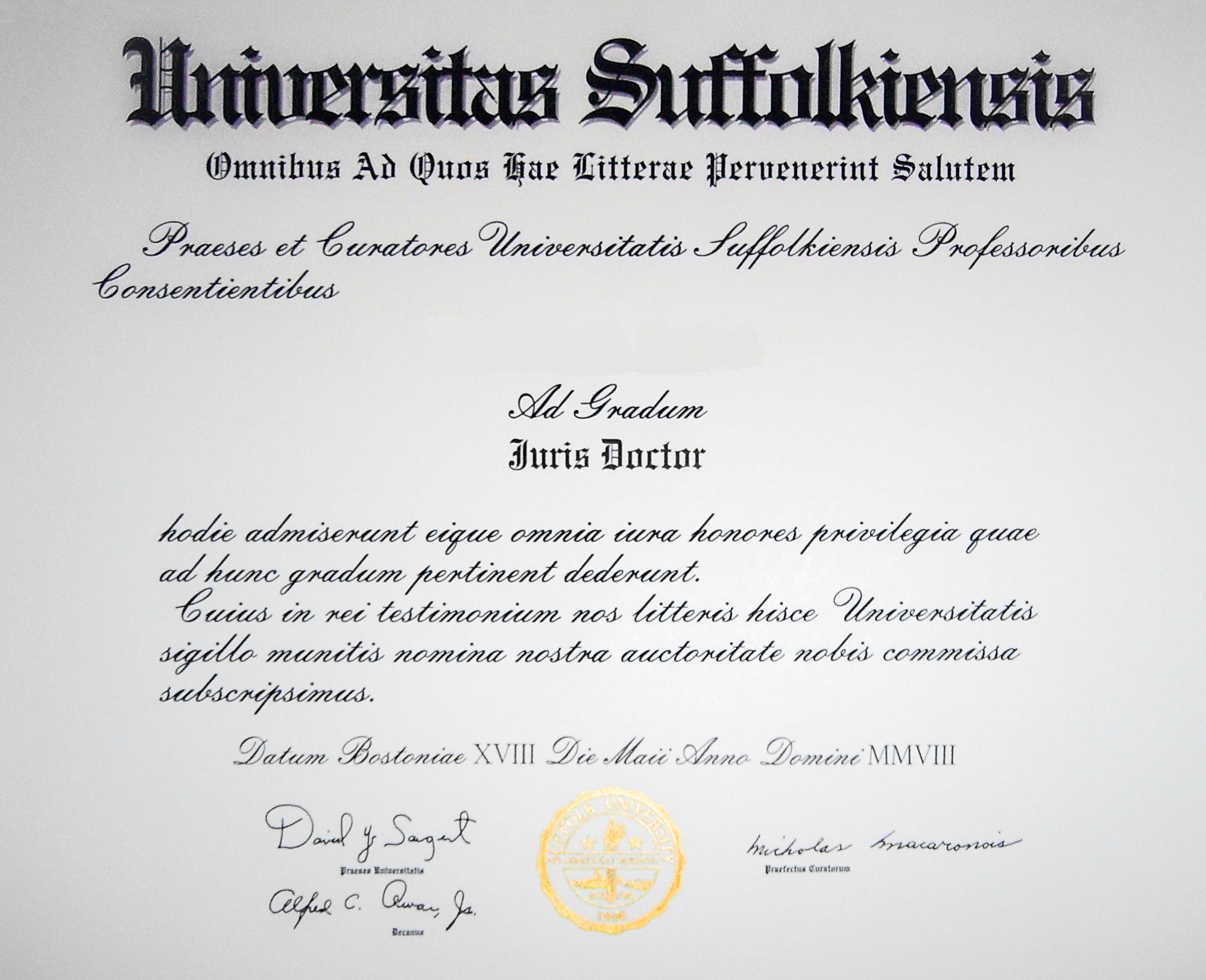
A typical Juris Doctor diploma from the United States, here from Suffolk University Law School in 2008.

=== Austria ===
Magister iuris (Mag. iur.) ("Master of Law") in Austria. It is a master's level degree and the first academic title within both systems. After three years of practice, students can take the "Anwaltsprüfung," an equivalent of the bar exam.

=== Brazil ===
Bacharel em Direito (Bachelor of Laws) or Bacharel em Ciências Jurídicas e Sociais (Bachelor of Laws and Social Sciences), in Brazil. It is an undergraduate degree. To be a lawyer and be admitted at the Ordem dos Advogados do Brasil (Brazilian Bar Association), the Bachelor must be approved at the Brazilian Bar Exam. If the Selection and Registration Committee accept the new member, they will be considered an Advogado (Attorney at Law/Advocate).

=== Canada ===
Canada's legal system is composed of both common law and civil law elements. As of 2019, the professional degree required to become a common law lawyer is a Juris Doctor (J.D.). Formerly, this degree was called a Bachelor of Laws (LL.B., Legum Baccalaureatus in Latin), but the name was phased out. LL.B. holders were often given the chance to convert their degrees to the new designation. Despite having the word "Doctor" in the name, the J.D. remains a second-entry undergraduate programme, requiring some years of undergraduate study before applicants are eligible. For Quebec, where provincial law is a hybrid of French-heritage civil law for civil matters and common law for public, criminal, and federal law matters, the professional degree is often called the Bachelor of Civil Law (B.C.L.) in English, and has other designations at various institutions in Quebec. Prior to getting called to the bar in one of Canada's provinces or territories, degree-holders must complete bar exams and articling terms (professional apprenticeships with practising lawyers) or the equivalent thereof.

For graduate academic study in law, the master's level designation is the Master of Laws (LL.M., Legum Magister in Latin). Doctoral-level legal research degrees vary in title by institution, but the designations include the Doctor of Juridical Science (S.J.D., Scientiae Juridicae Doctor in Latin), Doctor of Philosophy in Law (Ph.D., Philosophiae Doctor in Latin), or Doctor of Laws (LL.D., Legum Doctor in Latin) for common law-based doctorates and the Doctor of Civil Law (D.C.L.) for civil law-based doctorates.

The degree of Doctor of Laws (LL.D., Legum Doctor in Latin) is reserved at some universities for honorary use.

=== Croatia ===
Magister iuris (Mag. iur.) ("Master of Law") in Croatia. It is a master's level degree and the first academic title within the system. After three years of practice, students can take the "Pravosudni ispit," an equivalent of the bar exam.

=== Finland ===
Having a Master's degree in law is the basic qualification for the legal profession.

=== Germany ===
Erstes Juristisches Staatsexamen is partially equivalent to the Bar exam, since the second part (Zweites Juristisches Staatsexamen), is the German equivalent to the Bar exam in the U.S. At some universities you either become a "Lizentiat des Rechts (Licentiatus iuris)", a Magister iuris, or a Diplom-Jurist. It is a master's-level degree.

=== Italy ===
Laurea magistrale in giurisprudenza, in Italy. To practice law, it is also necessary to pass the state examination and register with the local bar association.

=== Mexico ===
Licenciatura en Derecho ("Bachelor in Law") in Mexico.

=== Russia ===
In Russia, legal education is offered through multiple pathways: a 4-year Bachelor's degree, a 5-year Specialist degree in specific law-related fields (such as Legal Support of National Security or Law Enforcement), or a 2-year Master's degree. The traditional 5-year Specialist degree in general law no longer exists as a specialty. While the Specialist degree is formally a single-cycle integrated program distinct from the two-cycle Bachelor's-Master's structure, it is widely considered equivalent to a Master's level qualification by many foreign credential evaluators. Holders of either a Specialist or Master's degree in law are eligible to apply for post-graduate studies (aspirantura), a 3 years research program leading to the Candidate of Sciences degree, which is internationally recognized as equivalent to a PhD. Starting in the 2026-2027 academic year, a new three-tier system will replace the current structure, with a 4-6 year "Basic Higher Education" level that incorporates and expands upon the Specialist model.

=== Spain ===
Spanish universities confer a Bachelor's Degree in Law. At one time, students earned law degrees as a part of the five-year Bologna Process. The modern Spanish law program consists of four years, with internship and to specialize and it has a graduate level (it is necessary to study a master's degree).

=== Switzerland ===
Lizentiat der Rechtswissenschaften (German) / Licence en droit (French) until 2004 and Master of Law (MLaw) since 2004 (as a result of the Bologna Process) in Switzerland. It is a masters level degree.

=== Ukraine ===
Since 2017, the main degree in law in Ukraine is a Master of Laws degree (mahistr prava, 1.5 or 2 years of study after obtaining a Bachelor of Laws degree).

It may be obtained only after obtaining a Bachelor of Laws degree (bakalavr prava, 4 years of study after graduation from high school).

Until 2017 Ukrainian universities also conferred a Specialist in Law degrees (spetsialist prava or iuryst). Until 2002 it required 5 years of study after graduation from high school (according to the system of education inherited from the Soviet era). In 2002–2017, a Specialist in Law degree existed alongside the Master of Laws; in these years Specialist in Law programs lasted 1 year after obtaining Bachelor of Laws degree). In 2016, students were enrolled on the specialist's programs for the last time.

=== United Kingdom and Ireland ===
Universities in the United Kingdom generally award a Bachelor of Laws (LL.B.) for undergraduate legal studies, although some award a Bachelor of Arts as their standard undergraduate law degree, as with the B.A. in jurisprudence at the University of Oxford and the B.A. Tripos in Law at the University of Cambridge. The Bachelor of Civil Law (B.C.L.) degree awarded by the University of Oxford is in fact a postgraduate degree, similar to an LL.M. elsewhere.

In the Republic of Ireland, undergraduate law degrees are offered in the same fashion as in the United Kingdom. While the constituent universities of the National University of Ireland award a Bachelor of Civil Law (B.C.L.) degree as their primary undergraduate law degree, it is in fact a common law degree that is directly equivalent to an LL.B. degree elsewhere. The Bachelor of Laws (LL.B.) degree is the degree generally awarded by other universities and colleges in Ireland.

Many universities also offer a Master of Laws. Also referred to as an LL.M. from its Latin name, Legum Magister. It is an advanced academic degree pursued by those holding a professional law degree or a degree in a relevant field.

=== Others ===
Juris Doctor (J.D.) in the United States and Japan (also offered at some schools in Canada, the United Kingdom, Australia, and Hong Kong). It is a professional degree.

Legum Doctor (known as the LL.D., or in some jurisdictions Doctor of Laws) is in some jurisdictions the highest academic degree in law and is equivalent to a Ph.D., and in others is an honorary degree only.

Doctor of Juridical Science (S.J.D.) is a research doctorate in law awarded mostly in the United States and Canada.

== See also ==
- Legal education
- Admission to practice law
- Magister Juris
