= Modrow government =

Final socialist government of the German Democratic Republic

Cabinet of Hans Modrow Government of National Responsibility
- 13th Cabinet of East Germany

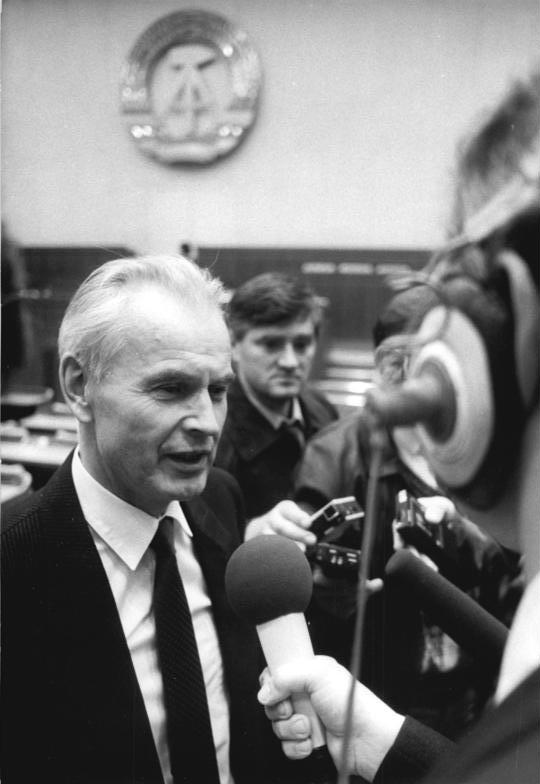
- Modrow is interviewed in the Palace of the Republic, the seat of the East German government.
- Date formed: 13 November 1989
- Date dissolved: 12 April 1990 (4 months and 30 days)

People and organisations
- Chairman of the State Council: Egon Krenz; Manfred Gerlach
- Chairman of the Council of Ministers: Hans Modrow
- Deputy Chairman of the Council of Ministers: Christa Luft
- Status in legislature: Government of national unity

History
- Legislature term: 9th Volkskammer
- Predecessor: Sixth Stoph cabinet
- Successor: de Maizière cabinet

The Modrow government refers to the government of the German Democratic Republic (GDR) led by Socialist Unity Party (SED) official Hans Modrow from November 1989 until East Germany's first democratically-elected government took power on 18 March 1990. Until February 1990, it was the last socialist government of the GDR. From February onward, it was a national unity government including members of the opposition, making it the first true coalition government of the GDR.

== Background ==
Spurred on by the liberal policies of Glasnost and Perestroika in the Soviet Union, and Mikhail Gorbachev's apparent tolerance of liberal reforms in other countries in the Warsaw Pact, protests began to spread in the German Democratic Republic in 1989. This culminated in a large increase in citizens escaping from the country during the summer of 1989 after Hungary dismantled its portion of the Iron Curtain. At the same time opposition to the incumbent SED was growing – on 9 October 1989, for example, 70,000 people took part in a demonstration in Leipzig calling for free elections and other democratic rights which had been denied to East German citizens since the founding of the GDR. On 18 October 1989 Erich Honecker was ousted as leader by his Politburo as a result of his unwillingness to confront the societal problems which had led to the mass exodus and political protest. The relatively youthful Egon Krenz who was chosen as successor proved to be ineffective, and on 9 November 1989 the Berlin Wall was opened, becoming a symbol of the SED's complete loss of power. Within the first four days of the Wall's opening, 4.3 million people or 25% of the East German population had made the trip across the border to West Germany with many choosing to remain there to take advantage of the higher quality of life. Since 8 November a new Politburo had been in power when the previous one had unanimously resigned. Amongst the new members was former First Secretary of the SED in Dresden Hans Modrow. Despite the personnel change the new government was unable to bring stability to the situation, with increased absenteeism through emigration and citizens taking trips to West Germany placing higher pressure on the East German economy.

== Round Table ==
As a result of the increasingly fragmented nature of the East German political landscape

== Composition ==
The Council of Ministers was composed as follows:

Portfolio	Minister	Took office	Left office	Party
Chairman of the Council of Ministers	Hans Modrow	13 November 1989	12 April 1990	SED
Deputy Chairman of the Council of Ministers; Minister for Economic Affairs	Christa Luft	13 November 1989	12 April 1990	SED
Deputy Chairman of the Council of Ministers; Minister for Local Government Bodies	Peter Moreth	13 November 1989	12 April 1990	LDPD
Deputy Chairman of the Council of Ministers; Minister for Church Affairs	Lothar de Maizière	13 November 1989	12 April 1990	CDU
Minister for Foreign Affairs	Oskar Fischer	13 November 1989	12 April 1990	SED
Minister of the Interior	Lothar Ahrendt	13 November 1989	12 April 1990	SED
Minister of Defence	Theodor Hoffmann	13 November 1989	12 April 1990	SED
Minister for Finance and Prices	Uta Nickel	13 November 1989	24 January 1990	SED
Minister for Finance and Prices	Walter Siegert	29 January 1990	12 April 1990	SED
Minister for Education	Hans-Heinz Emons	13 November 1989	12 April 1990	SED
Minister for Science and Technology	Peter-Klaus Budig	13 November 1989	12 April 1990	LDPD
Minister for Trade and Supply	Manfred Flegel	13 November 1989	12 April 1990	NDPD
Minister for Construction and Housing	Gerhard Baumgärtel	13 November 1989	12 April 1990	CDU
Minister for Mechanical Engineering	Karl Grünheid	13 November 1989	11 January 1990	SED
Minister for Mechanical Engineering	Hans-Joachim Lauck	11 January 1990	12 April 1990	SED
Minister for Foreign Trade	Gerhard Beil	13 November 1989	12 April 1990	SED
Minister for Culture	Dietmar Keller	13 November 1989	12 April 1990	SED
Minister for Tourism	Bruno Benthien	13 November 1989	12 April 1990	LDPD
Minister for Health and Social Affairs	Klaus Thielmann	13 November 1989	12 April 1990	SED
Minister of Justice	Hans-Joachim Heusinger	13 November 1989	11 January 1990	LDPD
Minister of Justice	Kurt Wünsche	11 January 1990	12 April 1990	LDPD
Minister of Post and Telecommunications	Klaus Wolf	13 November 1989	12 April 1990	CDU
Minister for Transportation	Heinrich Scholz	12 April 1990	February 1990	SED
Minister for Transportation	Herbert Keddi	February 1990	2 October 1990	SED
Minister for Environmental Protection and Water Management	Hans Reichelt	12 April 1990	11 January 1990	DBD
Minister for Environmental Protection and Water Management	Peter Diederich	11 January 1990	2 October 1990	DBD
Minister for Nutrition, Agriculture and Forestry	Hans Watzek	13 November 1989	12 April 1990	DBD
Minister for Labour and Wages	Hannelore Mensch	13 November 1989	12 April 1990	SED
Head of the Office for National Security	Wolfgang Schwanitz	13 November 1989	11 January 1990	SED
Minister and Chairman of the Committee for People's Control	Heinz Kittner	4 February 1990	12 April 1990	SED
State Secretary and Head of the Office for Youth and Sport	Wilfried Poßner	30 November 1989	12 April 1990	SED
Ministers without portfolio	Tatjana Böhm	5 February 1990	12 April 1990	Independent Women's Association
Ministers without portfolio	Rainer Eppelmann	5 February 1990	12 April 1990	DA
Ministers without portfolio	Sebastian Pflugbeil	5 February 1990	12 April 1990	New Forum
Ministers without portfolio	Gerd Poppe	5 February 1990	12 April 1990	Initiative for Peace and Human Rights
Ministers without portfolio	Walter Romberg	5 February 1990	12 April 1990	SPD
Ministers without portfolio	Klaus Schlüter	5 February 1990	12 April 1990	Green League
Ministers without portfolio	Wolfgang Ullmann	5 February 1990	12 April 1990	B90
Ministers without portfolio	Matthias Platzeck	5 February 1990	12 April 1990	Green
Government spokesperson and Head of the Press Office	Wolfgang Meyer	30 November 1989	12 April 1990	SED
Representative of the Chairman of the Council of Ministers for the Central Round Table and for the dissolution of the Office for National Security	Walter Halbritter	December 1989	February 1990	SED

== Committees ==
Portfolio	Minister	Took office	Left office	Party
Chairman of the State Planning Commission	Gerhard Schürer	13 November 1989	11 January 1990	SED
Chairman of the Economic Committee	Karl Grünheid	11 January 1990	12 April 1990	SED

== See also ==
- Die Wende
- German Reunification
