= Hans-Joachim Heusinger =

German politician (1929–1990)

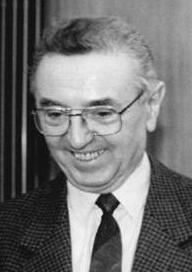
- Heusinger in 1989

Minister of Justice
- In office 16 October 1972 – 11 January 1990
- Chairman of the Council of Ministers: Willi Stoph; Horst Sindermann; Willi Stoph; Hans Modrow
- Preceded by: Kurt Wünsche
- Succeeded by: Kurt Wünsche
Volkskammer
Member of the Volkskammer for Jüterbog, Königs Wusterhausen, Luckenwalde, Zossen
In office 24 March 1961 – 5 April 1990
Preceded by	Hans Loch (1960)
Succeeded by	Constituency abolished

Personal details
- Born: Hans-Joachim Heusinger; 7 April 1925 Leipzig, Free State of Saxony, Weimar Republic (now Germany)
- Died: 26 June 2019 (aged 94) Berlin, Germany
- Party: Association of Free Democrats (1990)
- Other political affiliations: Liberal Democratic Party of Germany (1947–1990)
- Education: Deutsche Akademie für Staats- und Rechtswissenschaft „Walter Ulbricht“ (Dipl.-Jur.)
- Occupation: Politician; Party Functionary; Electrician
- Other offices held: 1972–1989: Deputy Chairman, Council of Ministers; 1972–1980: Deputy Chairman, Liberal Democratic Party of Germany; 1957–1959: Chairman, Bezirk Cottbus LDPD

Hans-Joachim Heusinger (7 April 1925 – 26 June 2019) was a German politician and party functionary of the Liberal Democratic Party of Germany (LDPD).

In the German Democratic Republic, he served as the longtime Minister of Justice until having to step down during the Peaceful Revolution.

== Life and career ==
=== Early career ===
The son of a worker, he completed training as an electrician from 1939 to 1942 after attending elementary school and was a soldier in the Wehrmacht until 1945.

From 1945 to 1951, he worked as an electrician and cable fitter.

== Bloc party politician ==
=== Early career ===
Heusinger joined the Liberal Democratic Party of Germany (LDPD), an East German bloc party beholden to the ruling Socialist Unity Party (SED), in 1947.

Heusinger initially became active in local politics. From 1951 to 1952, he was a member of the council of the Leipzig-Mitte district. From 1952 to 1957, he was a secretary of the Bezirk Leipzig LDPD. From 1953 to 1959, he was a deputy of the Bezirk Leipzig and Bezirk Cottbus district assemblies and a member of the Bezirk government.

From 1955 to 1960, he pursued distance learning at the German Academy for Political Science and Law (DASR) “Walter Ulbricht” in Potsdam, de facto a Marxist-Leninist cadre factory of the SED, earning a degree in law (Dipl.-Jur.). From 1957 to 1959, Heusinger subsequently served as chairman of the Bezirk Cottbus LDPD and as director of the Cottbus Chamber of Industry and Commerce. Since 1957, he additionally was a member of the central board of the LDPD and its political committee.

From 1959 to 1973, he was a secretary of the LDPD central board.

From 1958 to 1961, he was also a candidate for succession and from 1961, succeeding the deceased Hans Loch, to 1990 a member of the Volkskammer, nominally representing a constituency in southern Bezirk Potsdam. Heusinger initially was a member of the legal committee, and from 1963 to 1973 a member of the committee for industry, construction, and transport.

=== Minister ===
In October 1972, he was made Minister of Justice of the GDR, succeeding his party colleague Kurt Wünsche, who was fired for being critical of SED leader Erich Honecker's push for a complete nationalization of the GDR's remaining small businesses.

He additionally became Deputy Chairman of the Council of Ministers, though he did not have an office in the Council of Ministers' building, the bloc party's deputy chairman titles being symbolic. From 1972 to 1980, he also was deputy chairman of the LDPD.

The head of the main department responsible for legislation during Heusinger's tenure was Justice Councilor Gustav-Adolf Lübchen.

Heusinger was awarded the Patriotic Order of Merit in silver in 1967, in gold in 1975 and the honor clasp to this order in 1985.

=== Peaceful Revolution ===
During the Wende, Heusinger was one of only a few Ministers kept by the new transitional government of Hans Modrow, though he did lose the deputy chairman title. However, Heusinger's previous loyalty to the SED proved to be a problem, prompting Modrow to fire him in January 1990. His successor was Wünsche, who continued to head the Justice Ministry even in the GDR's last government, the only freely elected one.

The LDP, its new name after being renamed in February 1990, joined forces with the other liberal parties in the GDR to form the Association of Free Democrats (BFD). Heusinger left the BFD in April 1990.

=== Reunified Germany ===
After German reunification, Heusinger became active in the Society for Legal and Humanitarian Assistance (German: Gesellschaft zur Rechtlichen und Humanitären Unterstützung) (GRH), a historical negationist lobbying group for former GDR functionaries accused of political repression. In August 2007, Heusinger gave a speech at an event of the German Communist Party (DKP).

Heusinger died in 2019 at the age of 94.
