= Ernst Jennrich =

German gardener

- Born: 15 November 1911; Wedringen, Province of Saxony, German Empire
- Died: 20 March 1954 (aged 42); Dresden, East Germany
- Cause of death: Execution by guillotine
- Political party: Social Democratic Party (1928-1933 1945-1946); Socialist Unity Party (1946-1947)
- Children: 4

Ernst Jennrich (15 November 1911 – 20 March 1954) was a German gardener who was executed in East Germany for the murder of a Volkspolizei officer in Magdeburg during the Uprising of 1953.

Jennrich was a former member of the ruling Socialist Unity Party who joined the protests in Magdeburg and was accused of fatally shooting officer Georg Gaidzik during a confrontation on 17 June 1953. Jennrich was found guilty of Gaidzik's murder despite the weak evidence against him and sentenced to life imprisonment. Jennrich's sentence was increased to the death penalty days later under the influence of Justice Minister Hilde Benjamin, and he was executed by guillotine in Dresden.

On 20 August 1991, the original court verdict was overturned, and Jennrich was posthumously rehabilitated by a decision of the district court in Magdeburg.

== Early life ==
Ernst Jennrich was born on 15 November 1911 in Wedringen, a village in the Province of Saxony, a short distance to the north of Magdeburg, into a working-class family. He was the eighth of his parents' nine recorded children. After his eight years of compulsory schooling, he embarked on an apprenticeship as a baker, but then switched to gardening, which he completed. Jennrich was a member of the Young Socialists, the youth wing of the Social Democratic Party (SPD) between 1928 and 1930. He was then a full member of the SPD until the Nazi rise to power in 1933.

=== Nazi period ===
Jennrich was called up to undertake "emergency work", with one of the more high-profile projects on which he worked as a labourer being the construction of the Mittelland Canal. In 1935, he served a four-week prison sentence for criticising the government. In 1940, he was again conscripted by the Reich Labour Service to work at the nearby Junkers aircraft factory. In 1942, Jennrich was conscripted into the Wehrmacht and sent to serve on the Russian front, where he was badly injured by shrapnel. He was discharged from the army in 1944 and returned to work at Junkers till 1944, when he was again drafted into the Wehrmacht. In April 1945, as World War II drew to a close, he managed to desert and was almost immediately captured by the Ninth United States Army moving in on Magdeburg, spending six weeks as a prisoner of war. By the time of his release, the American forces in Magdeburg were giving way to Soviet military administration under the terms of the Yalta Conference between the leaders of the United States and the Soviet Union.

=== Soviet occupation zone ===
Following the German surrender and his release from captivity, Jennrich re-joined the SPD, though there is no indication that he became an active member. Having married in 1938 and now responsible for supporting his wife and four growing children, he established himself as an independent trader in fruit and vegetables in July 1945. In April 1946, the SPD was merged with the Communist Party of Germany under pressure from the Soviet Military Administration. Jennrich became a member of the resulting Socialist Unity Party of Germany (SED), though, much like with his SPD membership, he was not a party activist. Nevertheless, in 1947, he brought himself to the attention of the SED by resigning his party membership altogether. Some time later, he was called upon to explain why he resigned from the SED. In a courageous move, he explained it as his reaction to having been told, when attending a meeting with party officials, that he had acquired his fruit and vegetables business only through the [good offices of] the party". (Note: "....weil mir in der Funktionärssitzung gesagt wurde, ich hätte mein Geschäft nur durch die Partei bekommen".)

Jennrich was forced to abandon his business in 1949 when it became unprofitable, undertaking a succession of short-term jobs. In October 1949, the Soviet occupation zone was relaunched and rebranded as the German Democratic Republic (East Germany) and, following Western rejection of the Stalin Note in May 1952, subjected to an intensified programme of wide-ranging and far-reaching Sovietization.

== Uprising of 1953 ==
On 1 June 1953, he accepted a position as a gardener with an Agricultural Production Cooperative (LPG) based in Magdeburg. Around this time, tensions were mounting between workers and the SED over the Sovietization process. The crystallising issue was recent increases in highly unpopular "work quotas", which became a particular issue for workers in large production units. On 16 June 1953, construction workers in East Berlin started a strike and a march on the headquarters of the East German Trades Union Federation (which was a creature of the government). Strikes and street demonstrators spread across East Berlin and then, within a day, to other major East German cities, including Magdeburg.

At around 08:00 on 17 June 1953, Jennrich grabbed his bicycle and left his place of work, heading for the administrative office of the LPG for which he worked, in order to collect a documentary permit for timber clearance. While cycling across the city, about 200 workers had gathered along the Kastanienstraße, calling on passing citizens to join them for a general strike and street demonstration. They stopped trams and buses in order to encourage fellow workers to interrupt their commute and join the demonstration. By 09:30, the 200 demonstrators had grown to 2,000 and the numbers kept on growing. By the mid-morning, Magdeburg was on strike and the strikers were on the march across the city. Jennrich was initially bemused, unaware of why there were so many people out on the streets. He would later tell a court, "I simply had no idea how a strike was meant to look, since I'd never been involved in a strike". (Note: "Ich wusste ja gar nicht, wie ein Streik aussieht, denn ich habe ja noch keinen mitgemacht".) According to at least one source, as he returned from the LPG office with his timber clearance permit, Jennrich had to dismount from his bicycle because it was no longer safe, nor even possible, to cycle through the crowds. Elsewhere it is reported that as he began to understand "how a strike was meant to look", he presumably joined the flow in demonstrating against price rises for consumers and the imposition of increased work quotas on workers. Along the way he diverted to the furniture factory where his wife was employed, and asked the people he met there if they did not want to strike with the others. This casual question was evidently overheard by an SED party loyalist, and would later be interpreted by a court as Kriegs- und Boykotthetze, the very serious crime of "inciting war or boycott".

Later that morning, Jennrich met up with his eldest son and they returned to the streets, where there were shouts in the crowd that there was about to be a shooting incident at the Magdeburg police headquarters in Sudenburg. Jennrich made his way to the main police office with his son and others, where the gathering crowd was concentrated outside the Sudenburg detention centre, which was part of the same "justice complex" as the main police office. The sequence of the events that ensued is not consistently reported. Following Jennrich's posthumous rehabilitation by a Magdeburg court, it is his own version of events that becomes more persuasive, and which features in most of the more accessible sources. By the time Jennrich and his son arrived, probably at around mid-day, the guards outside the detention centre had already been disarmed by the crowd. An adolescent stranger next to him was brandishing a carbine rifle which Jennrich seized from him. An alternative version indicates that the reason he was holding the carbine was that it was Jennrich himself who had disarmed a guard outside the detention centre. Either way, Jennrich then fired two shots, first at the prison wall and then into the air. He did this in order the empty the weapon and thereby render it harmless. He discharged the gun harmlessly at the insistence of fellow protesters, and when he had done so he smashed it. During the course of the disturbance protesters had already broken through the outer gate of the "justice complex". Inside the complex, two policemen of the Volkspolizei and one official of the detested Ministry for State Security (Stasi) were fatally shot. It was later established to the satisfaction of a court that these killings were committed between 10:00 and 12:00, and so before Jennrich had arrived on the scene. That version that, if accepted and applied, would clear Jennrich of any involvement in the killings, and it is the version implicitly accepted by the court that posthumously rehabilitated him in 1991. But in the trial that established his guilt in September 1953, the inconvenient fact that Jennrich was probably elsewhere when the killings took place was overlooked or ignored by the judges.

=== Arrest ===
By the time Soviet troops arrived on the scene and a state of emergency had been declared at around 14:00, most of the crowd at Sudenburg had dispersed though Jennrich, for some reason, was still hanging around. Jennrich was arrested in the night on 19/20 June, and taken away for questioning by a small team of Soviet interrogators. Once they had finished with him, he was handed over to the East German authorities who prepared the charges.

The charges against Jennrich, which indicate that surveillance reports in respect of the accused had been received and evaluated over a significant period of time, are as follows:

- "...inciting boycott and murder against democratic institutions and organisations and, since 8 May 1945, endangering the peace of the German people through spreading propaganda in support of fascism: consistent with this, acting from insidious and base motives, making possible a further crime, being the intentional killing of a human being". (Note: "„Boykott und Mordhetze gegen demokratische Einrichtungen und Organisationen betrieben und hierbei nach dem 8. Mai 1945 durch Propaganda für den Faschismus den Frieden des deutschen Volkes gefährdet zu haben; in Tateinheit damit aus niedrigen Beweggründen heimtückisch, um eine andere Straftat zu ermöglichen, vorsätzlich einen Menschen getötet zu haben."the text is quoted here as quoted in "Magdeburg 17. Juni 1953", Magdeburger Museumshefte 2, Magdeburg 1993, p. 90.)

=== Trial ===
On 25 August 1953, Jennrich faced trial for the first time. It had been determined that he should be charged with the killing ofVolkspolizei Sergeant Georg Gaidzik who had been fatally injured by a gunshot during the fighting at the Sudenburg detention centre, it was alleged, between 10:00 and 12:00. Witnesses had been prepared appropriately, including another police officer who gave a clear account of the sequence of events. After the main gate to the Sudenburg justice complex had been broken down, demonstrators began to enter through it. One of them fired into the complex: the witness fired back, hitting the gunman in his leg. A second demonstrator had fired into the complex: again the witness had fired back, also hitting the second gunman in the leg. Then the witness saw that a window in the outer wall of the building beside the main gate was being smashed and someone was pointing a carbine from outside the justice complex through a hole in broken glass, towards Gaidzik. That was the source of fatal shot. The missing link in the evidence against Jennrich was that this witness never identified the individual with a carbine who had fired it. The only obvious link to Jennrich was that he had simply arrived and fired a carbine an hour or so later.

Permitted to address the judge in his own defence, Jennrich delivered an unexpectedly effective speech:

- "...I can only say this: that I never wished to become a murderer. And I never committed any murder, because I know for sure that I did not shoot through the window on the right [of the main gate] at any member of the Volkspolizei service. Furthermore I never had any wish to become the tool of these people, the tool of western provocateurs, nor of people who try to exploit the workers. I am not a person wishing to be exploited." (Note: "...ich kann nur das eine sagen, dass ich niemals zu einem Mörder werden wollte. Und ich niemals den Mord begangen habe, weil ich genau weiß, ich habe keinen Schuss in dem rechten Fenster abgegeben auf einen Volkspolizeiangehörigen. Und ich war auch niemals gewillt, Werkzeug dieser Menschen zu werden, oder Werkzeug der Provokateure vom Westen noch zumeist von Menschen, die versuchen, den Arbeiter auszubeuten. Ich bin kein Mensch, der sich ausbeuten lassen will".)

The court clearly had substantial doubts over witness statements presented to it, and sentenced Jennrich to life imprisonment of 25 August 1952.

=== Death penalty ===
Two days later, the public prosecutor lodged his appeal of Jennrich's sentence: "The protection of our peace loving state requires the death penalty for the crime committed by the accused". Under instructions from the Supreme Court of East Germany, the judges who had already heard the case on 25 August 1953 and delivered their agreed judgement conducted a further hearing on 6 October 1953 at the end of which they sentenced Jennrich to death. The entire process lasted only fifteen minutes. A further consideration of the evidence was deemed unnecessary. "...the protection of our social order requires that the highest penalty - being the elimination of the accused from our society, the death penalty - be invoked". (Note: "In Anbetracht dieser Gefährlichkeit erfordert es der Schutz unserer Gesellschaftsordnung, dass auf das höchste Strafmaß, nämlich die Ausmerzung des Angeklagten aus unserer Gesellschaft und somit die Todesstrafe erkannt wird.") The judges evidently felt they had no choice. Minister of Justice Hilde Benjamin had already shared her view: "We are of the view that for Jennrich the death penalty is appropriate". Nevertheless, one of the judges involved evidently had a moment of conscience at the obvious inconsistency between the evidence presented and the imposition of the death penalty. There is a gap on the document in one of the spaces intended for a judicial signature.

In November 1953, from the isolation cell in which he was being held, Jennrich wrote a detailed seven page plea for clemency to Wilhelm Pieck, the President of East Germany, in which he insisted on his innocence and declared himself ready to accept even the most difficult of working conditions "in order that I can later be accepted as a complete person within the social order of the German Democratic Republic", but this was rejected by Pieck.

Jennrich was transferred to the Zentrale Hinrichtungsstätte (National Execution facility) in Dresden, constructed during the Nazi period and still in regular use.

== Execution ==
On the morning of 20 March 1954, at approximately 04:00, Jennrich was executed on the guillotine, with little being known of his final hours. The death certificate necessary in order that the physical remains might be lawfully disposed of showed the causes of his death to have been "pneumonia" and "acute low blood pressure". Many years later, it emerged that he had written a farewell letter for his wife and sons, in which he continued to protest his innocence. Belatedly, the letter has found its way into the possession of one of his younger sons called, like his father, Ernst Jennrich.

His ashes were placed in an urn and then interred at the Urnenhain Tolkewitz Crematorium near the execution facility, where they remained till after reunification of Germany in 1990.

=== Posthumous rehabilitation ===
On 20 August 1991, following a successful application by his son Ernst Jennrich Jr., the "4th Criminal Senate" at the Halle District Court overturned the 1954 verdict against Ernst Jennrich Sr. and he was acquitted retrospectively. The opening up of East German archives from the courts and state justice officials after reunification had triggered a major wave of research on the 1953 uprising by respected academics such as, most notably Karl Wilhelm Fricke, and others. The "4th Criminal Senate" studied the 1953 and 1954 court reports and determined that Jennrich's 1954 conviction and sentencing had been unconstitutional even on the basis of the 1949 Constitution of East Germany, which was in force during the 1954 court process and when the decision was deemed to have been based. In 1954, the Magdeburg court had focused on Article 6 of the constitution, which included what amounted to a definition of the "Boykotthetze" (incitement to boycott) crime. The 1991 Halle court determined that Article 6 failed to define a crime except in the most generalised of terms: the crime of incitement to boycott is a crime within the meaning of the penal code". Furthermore, the 1991 hearing accepted the overwhelming evidence that the death sentence imposed in 1954 had resulted from a decision by the Halle court to treat an instruction to the chairman of the judges from the Minister of Justice (Hilde Benjamin) as binding. That represented a serious violation of the law - even the law applicable in East Germany in the aftermath of the 1953 uprising - on the part of the judges involved in the 1954 sentencing. The judges at the 1991 appeal hearing were also unanimous in supporting the retrospective acquittal with their opinion that Jennrich's participation in the uprising had been a legitimate "exercise of political opposition and - in essence - an instance of non-violent resistance". These had been constitutional rights, and not some compouding factor in the court deliberations conducted in Magdeburg in 1953 and 1954.
