= Ruth Lange (athlete) =

German athlete (1908–1994)

Ruth "Utti" Lange (13 March 1908 in Bernburg (Saale) - 1994) was a German athlete, who was successful in the 1920s in shot put and discus throw.

Ruth Lange was 1927 German champion in shot put with 11.32 m and in discus throw with 34.75 m. She set world records in shot put on 28 May 1927 in Prague with 10.84 m, on 6 August 1927 in Breslau with 11.32 m, and on 3 June 1928 in Berlin with 11.52 m. These records were recognised by the International Women's Sports Federation. When this organisation joined the IAAF in 1934, only the record which was current in 1934 was recognised. By this time, Lange, whose athletics club was SCC Berlin, was no longer active in athletics.

During World War II, Lange worked as a secretary for Paul Rosbaud.

Her sister was Hilde Benjamin, who was Minister of Justice in East Germany.

Lange taught at the Deutsche Hochschule für Leibesübungen.
