= Dora Benjamin =

German psychologist and economist (1901–1946)

Dora Benjamin (30 April 1901 – 1 June 1946) was a German economist, feminist, educational psychologist and child advocate. She was the younger sister of the doctor Georg Benjamin and the philosopher Walter Benjamin, and the best friend of Georg's wife Hilde, later East German Minister of Justice.

== Life ==
Dora Benjamin was born into a bourgeois Jewish family on 30 April 1901 in Berlin, the daughter of Emil Benjamin, an antiques dealer, and Pauline Schönflies, from a wealthy agriculturalist family. Together with her older brothers, Walter and Georg, she enjoyed a culturally rich upper-middle-class childhood. She finished high school in 1918 and attended courses by the feminist Helene Lange. After studying economics at the University of Greifswald, she gained a doctorate in 1924 with a thesis 'The social situation of Berlin women garment workers, with special reference to children.'. She recommended regulation to ensure women worked in factories rather than at home, with enforced provision of daycare centers and kindergartens.

In 1929, she collaborated with Georg and Walter on a 'Healthy Nerves' exhibition at the hospital in Wedding, Berlin, using the occasion to campaign against child labor. She began to research the educational and psychological needs of working-class women and children and wrote essays in social criticism for German periodicals.

When the Nazis came to power in 1933, they took her brother Georg into protective custody. Dora's writings may have been destroyed in the Nazi book burnings and subsequent confiscations. Dora and her brother Walter, each fled to France in 1933 by different routes. A refugee, she took care of refugee children in her small apartment. On 15 May 1940, Benjamin was taken in the Vel' d'Hiv Roundup to the Vélodrome d'Hiver, a boarding school for single and childless women. A week later, along with many other German women, she was interned in the Gurs internment camp. There, she began research into the traumatic effect of camps on children. She was able to leave the camp and escape to Lourdes after the Germans invaded France in June 1940. She hoped to work in the United States after the war and had been promised an entry visa there but lacked documentation to leave France and was weakened by illness. In December 1942, she fled the German occupation of France to Switzerland. Blocked at the border, she managed not to be sent back to France owing to her ill health.

In Swiss exile in 1942–1943 Dora Benjamin continued her research into refugee children traumatized by concentration camps and became involved in educational reform projects. In early 1945, she took part in the Montreux Refugee Conference, representing the Swiss Workers' Relief Organization. She spoke "for those refugees who cannot represent themselves, for their refugee children," and warned against neglecting "return and migration issues" in European reconstruction.

Diagnosed with breast cancer in 1944, she died in Zürich on 1 June 1946.

Hilde Benjamin published a volume of Dora's doctoral thesis. A Berlin park has been named after her since 2009.

== Works ==
- Die soziale Lage der Berliner Konfektionsheimarbeiterinnen mit besonderer Berücksichtigung der Kinderaufzucht. Versuch einer Wertung der Heimarbeit im Vergleich mit der Fabrikarbeit unter dem Gesichtspunkt der bestmöglichen Aufzucht des Kindes.. Dissertation, Greifswald, 1924.
- 'Der Stand der Heimarbeit in Deutschland', Soziale Praxis, Vol. 34 (1925)
- Der Stand der Heimarbeit in Deutschland. Ergebnisse der Deutschen Heimarbeitausstellung, 1925. Schriften der Gesellschaft für sociale Reform, 77. Jena: G. Fischer, 1928.
- 'Verbreitung und Auswirkung der Frauenerwerbsarbeit' [The spread and impact of women's employment], in Schmidt-Beil, Ada (ed.), Die Kultur der Frau. Eine Lebenssymphonie der Frau des XX. Jahrhunderts [The culture of women. A life symphony of the women of the 20th century]v. Berlin, 1931.
