= Erna Dorn =

Erna Dorn (17 July 1911 – 1 October 1953) was a victim of the politicised justice system in the German Democratic Republic (East Germany). She is believed to be the only female to have been sentenced and executed in the aftermath of the East German uprising of 1953.

According to records she claimed to have worked in the political department at Ravensbrück concentration camp and to have been responsible for the deaths of between eighty and ninety inmates. She was sentenced to death on 22 June 1953 by the district court at Halle, found guilty of war mongering and boycott incitement against the German Democratic Republic: she was executed by guillotine three months later. On 22 March 1994 the conviction and sentence were posthumously revoked.

There is much that remains unclear about Erna Dorn. Although she was executed as Erna Dorn, no records have surfaced identifying her by that name from before 1945. Surviving sources depend heavily on court files containing records of investigations and researches created during the four years prior to her execution, between 1949 and 1953. Her testimony during this period appears to have become ever more outlandish. There are also suggestions that some of what appears in these East German official records is uncorroborated and might be based on statements inaccurately attributed to Dorn by interrogators. Two alternative birth names that appeared were Erna Kaminski and Erna Brüser. Towards the end she came up with more (apparently fictitious) identities for herself. There is an alternative birth date of 28 August 1913. Also, between 1945 and 1949 she was married, and may be identified in sources by her married name as Erna Gewald. (An earlier marriage, between 1935 and 1943, to a Communist activist called Erich Brüser, seems to have been another fiction.)

== Life ==
Erna Dorn was born in East Prussia which at that time was part of Germany. (Since 1945 the part of East Prussia in which she was born has been redesignated as the Kaliningrad Oblast and has now become a - physically separated - part of Russia.) She was either born in 1911 in Tilsit or else in 1913 in Königsberg. Her father, Arthur Kaminsky, was a clerical worker who later, according to research published in 1994, may have worked for the Gestapo during the 1930s, possibly towards the end of that decade as a senior Gestapo officer in Königsberg. Erna attended an all-girls' secondary school and then embarked on an apprenticeship with the Chamber of Commerce in Königsberg. From 1932 she was working with the Königsberg police department where, in one submission, she states she was employed as a typist and in another submission that she was employed as an assistant police officer. According to later statements recorded during the 1950s, from the end of 1934 or early in 1935 she was working for the Gestapo after which, in 1941, she was sent to work in the political department at Ravensbrück concentration camp. An earlier statement, that she herself was arrested by the Gestapo, along with her father and her husband, Erich Brüser, in June 1940 and thereafter been held in a succession of concentration camps, had disappeared in later reports. She also stated, according to interrogation records, that between 1934 and 1935 she was a Nazi Party member, but there is no independent confirmation of this.

She turned up in Halle in 1945, apparently arriving from the direction of Czechoslovakia, in the context of the massive ethnic cleansing of 1944/45. A forged release document purportedly from the concentration camp at Hertine is dated 12 May 1945 and identifies her as Erna Brüser, born Erna Scheffler, the daughter of a railway inspector called Artur Scheffler. For the next six years she lived in the Soviet occupation zone of Germany (after October 1949 relaunched as the German Democratic Republic / East Germany), not as a former Nazi supporter or official, but as a surviving victim of Nazi persecution. She joined the Communist Party in 1945. Following the contentious merger in April 1946 that created what would become the ruling party in a new kind of German one-party dictatorship, she was one of many thousands who lost no time in signing their party membership over to the new Socialist Unity Party ("Sozialistische Einheitspartei Deutschlands" / SED).

She must have been convincing as a concentration camp survivor. She convinced a veteran of the Spanish Civil War and "fighter against Fascism", Max Gewald whom she married in December 1945. Shortly afterwards the couple moved into their own two room apartment in which, from March 1946, she is recorded as having lived as a "housewife".

Things began to unravel in August 1948 when the trial opened in Halle of Gertrud Rabestein, notorious as a Ravensbrück concentration camp guard and dog handler. Dorn was called upon to testify. She was probably concerned that her carefully crafted false identity, as a Ravensbrück survivor, might be uncovered if she were to appear in court. She therefore asked to be excused from testifying on the grounds that she was pregnant. The pregnancy lasted two years. In addition to enabling her to avoid the trial of Gertrud Rabestein, it entitled her to various special allowances in a land that, following the slaughter of war, was desperately short of people of working and child-bearing age. However, the duration of her pregnancy was eventually noticed. The Union of Persecutees of the Nazi Regime ("Vereinigung der Verfolgten des Naziregimes" / VVN) produced a report stating that "[Dorn] excused herself from the duty [to testify] and for two years presented herself, in writing and through acting, stuffed up with pillows, as a pregnant and thereby silenced woman".

The VVN seems to have played a lead role in building a case against her following the two-year pregnancy. In January 1950 she was sentenced to eleven months in jail for "fraud and economic crimes". She was expelled from the party. Max Gewald had already divorced her in October or December 1949, and taken the further rather unusual step of obtaining an injunction to prevent her from continuing to use her married name - his name. From this point till her execution Erna Dorn was held in state detention almost permanently. She was released at the end of her initial sentence in December 1950, but after a few weeks at liberty she was arrested in January 1951 and sentenced to eighteen months in jail for theft. Unemployed and homeless she had, it was determined, colluded with accomplices to steal the suitcases of travellers at the city's main railway station. There had been other instances of theft cited, but she was released in November 1951 as part of an amnesty. She was back in prison in December 1951. By this time the accounts of herself that she provided were becoming increasingly fantastical and implausible, possibly in order to impress fellow prisoners and possibly in order to avenge herself against people by whom she felt she had been betrayed.

She provided investigators with ever more far-fetched stories about alleged espionage for western powers and her Nazi past. She named Max Gewald, her former husband, as a closet American agent and a former commanding officer at Ravensbrück. All her allegations were passed on to the newly founded and rapidly developing Ministry for State Security (Stasi) and investigated with excruciating care, causing intense distress to Gewald. Finally she created an elaborate past for herself involving work for the Gestapo and the police during the Nazi years. At one stage she was released, presumably when interrogators concluded that there was no substance to her self-accusations, but elsewhere in the state hierarchy people evidently took a different view. After two weeks she was arrested on suspicion of crimes against humanity and then, on 21 May 1953, sentenced to 15 years in prison by the district court at Halle. She had at one stage claimed to be a dog handler at Ravensbrück who had set dogs to tear apart camp inmates. It was apparently in this context that she said she had been responsible for the deaths of between 80 and 90 concentration camp inmates. However, she was convicted solely on the basis of her own submissions, and the court records consist almost exclusively of notes taken during her interrogation sessions, from which it is apparent that her interrogator, a Leutnant Bischoff, had reacted to her "confessions" with sustained unbelief. Had the evidence been persuasive and appropriately corroborated it seems likely that her sentence, having regard to the crimes against humanity for which she was convicted, should have been much harsher than a mere custodial one.

Intensive follow-up investigation by the VVN and other investigating bodies failed to find any evidence of a Nazi past for either Dorn or Gewald. Gertrud Rabestein, the real Ravensbrück dog handler, with whose case Erna Dorn had apparently conflated her own self-incrimination, had already been in prison, following her own trial, for two years.

Not for the first time, events now intervened to change the course of Erna Dorn's life. Three weeks after her trial, on 17 June 1953, she found herself in the Penal Detention Centre II ("Strafvollzugsanstalt II") in Halle's "Klein Stein Strasse" (loosely: "Small stone-surfaced street"). It remains unclear why she was in the detention facility: there is speculation that she may have still been awaiting transfer to a more permanent prison elsewhere in the country. 17 June 1953 was the high point of the short-lived East German uprising of 1953. There were stoppages and protests across the country, some of them violent. In Halle, around tea time, Penal Detention Centre II was stormed by protesters. Erna Dorn was one of 254 inmates who unexpectedly found themselves free to leave the institution. There are no police or other official reports of what she did next, but according to her own testimony her first destination was the city's evangelical mission in order to obtain civilian clothes, something to eat, and the possibility of a place to sleep. It is not clear whether she was able to stay at the mission overnight, but by Midday on 18 June 1953 she had been recaptured and taken back to prison.

On 20 June 1953, two days after her re-capture, an article appeared in the party newspaper, "Freiheit" ("Freedom") which named Erna Dorn as an SS commander ("SS-Kommandeuse"). It appears that the authorities were keen to use the "Dorn case" as evidence for the fascist character of the 17 June uprising and she was shortly afterwards identified as a leader of the insurrection in Halle. In fact, no independent witness was ever found to testify that she had been present among the 60,000 people who had gathered in the Hallmarkt (central square) on the night of 17 June in order to protest against wage cuts and the Soviet occupation. Nevertheless, following her recapture on 18 June a letter had been "found on her" including the following text: "Dear Dad, Since yesterday I've been at liberty. .... May it be that the hour has now arrived when our beloved Führer will return and the flags of the Nazi Party will fly again and I will be able to re-apply for my work in the police department or our Gestapo ..." By the time she was identified as an SS commander in "Freiheit", she had evidently been subjected to interrogation and, to the extent that interrogation evidence presented to the court a few days later is to be taken at face value, she had taken the opportunity to incriminate herself. She asserted that she had addressed the crowd in the Hallmarkt on the night of 17 June and, further, told interrogators that "knowing that the government of the German Democratic Republic had been overthrown, I said that the day of liberation had come ... Long live Freedom, Long live Revolution, Down with the Government of the German Democratic Republic". There is no evidence concerning her alleged speech to the crowd from any of the 60,000 protesters who were present at the time, and there is indeed no information in the court records concerning Erna Dorn's actions and whereabouts between 16.00 and 19.00 during 17 June 1953 from any source other than her own statements as they were recorded by her Stasi interrogators.

== Death ==
An evening session of the Halle district court, lasting three and a half hours, took place on 22 June 1953. Based on the "proofs" presented to the court, Erna Dorn was condemned to death. An appeal presented by her official defence solicitor and a letter to President Pieck requesting a pardon were both rejected because the accused party was allegedly a ringleader of the recent disruption in Halle. On 28 September 1953 Erna Dorn was transferred to a detention facility in Dresden. On 1 October 1953 she was guillotined at the nearby national execution centre. Her corpse was taken for cremation to Dresden Tolkewitz, in the city's eastern edge. Here the causes of her death were recorded in the crematorium register as "Bronchopneumonia 431" and "acute cardiac and circulatory weaknesses". This is almost always the cause of death in the register in respect of the 62 political dissidents from across the country who were executed and cremated in Dresden during the early 1950s.

== Trial, conviction and reconsideration ==
Even after 1990 and the opening up of the Stasi archives, the case of Erna Dorn remains a puzzle, because almost everything that is known about the woman comes from the interrogation records of the Ministry for State Security (usually known more colloquially as "the Stasi"). At least as regards any of these records created after the events of 17 June 1953, they are subject to the suspicion of modification or worse, since they were produced at a time when the government was consciously trying to find corroboration to support the characterisation of the 1953 uprising as a fascist manifestation. The idea of a trial for "crimes against humanity" and the concomitant consideration of a death sentence appear only in records dating from after the June uprising. It is also noteworthy that one month earlier, the sentence given to Dorn was uncharacteristically mild under the circumstances. This in turn gives rise to serious doubts over whether, at the trial which is reported to have taken place on 21 May 1953, she really was convicted of the Nazi crimes imputed to her in records which may have been prepared only after 17 June 1953. There indeed remains some doubt over whether the trial of 21 May 1953 ever took place at all. Penal Detention Centre II ("Strafvollzugsanstalt II"), from which Dorn was unexpectedly released by protesters on 17 June 1953, was a detention facility used for those under investigation. Someone who had been sentenced as a former SS commander four weeks earlier would not normally still be held in this type of facility.

By 21 June 1953 the uprising had already been effectively crushed by fraternal Soviet tanks and the newly appointed Justice Minister, Hilde Benjamin was demanding exemplary death sentences in order to provide proof of the fascist origins of the insurrection. Therefore, the interrogators knew before she opened her mouth what Erna Dorn was required to say. And the language she uses in the records of her final interrogation sessions self-evidently employs party jargon and not the somewhat disjointed language of her many earlier submissions.

On 22 March 1994 the Halle district court declared Erna Dorn's death sentence unlawful and posthumously revoked it.

== The many names of Erna Dorn ==
Erna Dorn is the name under which her execution in 1953 was recorded, and it is the name by which she has most frequently been identified subsequently. It seems not to have been one of the names by which she was known before 1951, however. When she was re-arrested in November 1951 she had recently received a court injunction in the aftermath of her divorce, preventing her from using her real former married name of Erna Gewald. She now admitted that the identity with which she had arrived in Halle in 1945 was a fiction, and proceeded to create a new (fictitious) identity and autobiographical context which she provided to her interrogators. She said she had worked in the Gestapo and in the concentration camps. Over time she had come into contact with a western espionage ring which was headed up by a former Gestapo man from Königsberg called Kaminski (or Kaminsky). Her first husband, Erich Dorn, was an SS junior officer had worked as a courier for the espionage ring. Investigators from the Stasi and the VVN brought their resources into play to investigate the story. Enthusiastic VVN investigators reported that they had identified an Erna Dorn, born Erna Kaminski on 17 July 1911 in Tilsit, who had been present at Ravensbrück and that there had been an SS NCO called Erich Dorn working at Ravensbrück. However, subsequent investigations determined that there had never been a Ravensbrück guard called Dorn, and attempts to match Erna Dorn's narrative to any other couple at the camp failed. Stasi investigators ended up concluding that the entire wartime identity and biography of Erna and Erich Dorn which their subject had created from 1951 was lies from beginning to end.

Erna Kaminski was the maiden name imputed to Erna Dorn according to the identity which she created for herself and for the authorities during and after 1951. Whether or not Kaminski was nevertheless her true birth name is unclear.

Erna Köhler (born Erna Kecker) was the name she offered her interrogators in June 1952. Unlike Erna Dorn, Erna Köhler had not been at Ravensbrück but at Auschwitz. Evidently exasperated, her Stasi interrogator Leutnant Lutze noted in his record for 1 August 1953, "It turns out that everything from Dorn is a fabrication, with zero correlation to truth". However, the planned execution having by this time been scheduled and signed off by the Politburo, the writing down of Leutnant Lutze's insight was no reason to set the sentence aside.

Erna Scheffler is the most plausible "real" birth name for the woman identified as Erna Dorn, according to the author and writer Ilko-Sascha Kowalczuk, an experienced and respected scholar and researcher of the single-party dictatorship that was East Germany. Scheffler is the maiden name included in the identity she produced in 1945, and according to which, following her marriage in 1935, she became Erna Brüser.

Erna Brüser is the name used in the forged release document purportedly from the concentration camp at Hertine, dated 12 May 1945 which Erna Dorn used to build her identity after she arrived in Halle in May 1945. It was the name used when she married in December 1945. According to this version of Erna, she was the widow of Erich Brüser a member of the (at the time illegal) Communist Party whom she had married in 1935 and who had died in 1943 at the Sachsenhausen concentration camp. She said that she and he (along with her father) had been arrested in June 1940, at which time she had lost contact with their two children.

Erna Gewald was Erna Dorn's (genuine) married name during her marriage to Max Gewald, between 1945 and their divorce in 1949.
