= Magister Juris =

Academic degree in law awarded by some universities

A MJur (Magister Juris or Master of Jurisprudence; common abbreviations include MJur, M.Jur., Mag. Jur. and Mag. iur.) is an academic degree in law awarded by some universities. It may be an integrated master's degree, a taught postgraduate master's degree or a research master's degree, depending on the country and the university.

== Austria ==
The traditional (pre-Bologna process) law degree in Austria is the Magister or Magistra der Rechtswissenschaften (Mag. iur.). This has a minimum duration of four years, but normally takes four and a half to five years. This remains the preferred route for law students in Austria despite the existence of a post-Bologna process Bachelor of Laws plus Master of Laws route.

== Germany ==
Historically, German law students did not receive any academic degree upon completion of their curriculum. Instead, after usually four or five years of study, students sit their First State Examination (Erstes Staatsexamen) in Law, which is administered by the ministry of justice of the respective state, not the university. More recently, however, some universities have begun to award their students a Magister Juris upon passing the First State Examination, in order to indicate the equivalence of the education to a master's degree in other disciplines. Examples include the universities of Cologne, Constance and Heidelberg. Other German universities are awarding a Diplom-Jurist degree to their law examinees, following the same principle.

== Italy ==
After the Bologna process, the former Laurea in Giurisprudenza had been replaced by a first level degree, Laurea in Scienze Giuridiche (three years), and a second level degree, Laurea Specialistica in Giurisprudenza (two further years). This system changed in 2006: at present the Laurea Magistrale in Giurisprudenza (i.e., Magister Juris) is the law degree in Italy. It is a five-year, second level (master's) degree which does not require a previous bachelor's degree for the admission (Laurea Magistrale a ciclo unico, i.e. integrated master's degree).

== United Kingdom ==
=== As a taught degree ===
The Magister Juris is a one-year taught master's degree offered at the Faculty of Law, University of Oxford. It is described by the university as "a counterpart to the BCL ... but for students from a civil law background". Much of the course content is shared with the BCL, and students have an option to write a 10,000 to 12,500-word dissertation.

Academic dress for the MJur is the same as for the BCL, an outward sign of their shared content and structure: A black gown of silk with a form of black lace sewn on the collar, the lower part of the back, and down the sleeves which are closed and cut straight, but have an opening just above the elbow. The hood, of Dean Burgon shape, is of blue corded silk or poplin with white fur fabric. Holders of the MJur degree rank directly below Bachelors of Civil Law, and above Bachelors of Medicine and Surgery.

Admission to the MJur is slightly more competitive than to the BCL: According to data disclosed by the University of Oxford, for 50 places available each year, 376 people applied on average in the three years before the academic year 2019/20, which equals an average application success rate of 13.2%. The success rate for BCL applications in the same period was 15.1%.

Historically, students from civil law jurisdictions were able to study for the BCL at Oxford, but had to meet additional requirements. Following the establishment of the Institute for European and Comparative Law at Oxford, in 1992 the faculty of law introduced a one-year degree programme of Magister Juris in European and Comparative Law, and in 1999/2000 closed the BCL to students from civil law jurisdictions. The Magister Juris at that time allowed to choose a number of undergraduate options, as well as an option in the history faculty. As the MJur and BCL programmes became more similar, the qualifier in European and Comparative Law was dropped in 2001.

=== As a research degree ===
The Master of Jurisprudence is offered as a one-year research degree at Durham Law School at Durham University and Birmingham Law School at the University of Birmingham. It is awarded on the basis of a candidate's thesis (usually 40,000 words) in an approved area of law, under the supervision of an academic staff. The MJur must demonstrate an advanced understanding of the subject but – in contrast to a PhD – need not constitute an original contribution to knowledge or reach a standard worthy of publication. Unlike LLM or Oxford's MJur dissertations, MJur degrees at Durham and Birmingham are examined by appointed internal and external examiners, for which a report is prepared. A viva voce, an essential component of PhDs at British universities, is discretionary for MJur degrees.

The Master of Jurisprudence is also available at Queen's University Belfast as an exit award for their Juris Doctor research degree for students whose dissertation is judged to be of master's rather than doctoral standard.

The Durham MJur uses the hood formally used for the Durham Bachelor of Civil Law: an unlined palatinate silk full-shape hood, bound with fur.

== See also ==
- Master of Laws
- Master of Jurisprudence
