= Master of Jurisprudence =

One year law degree for nonlawyers

A Master of Jurisprudence is a graduate-level professional degree in law and legal studies. It is designed for those with a bachelor's degree in a non-law field of study. The degree does not qualify an individual for bar admission.

The degree may go by several names, including a Master in Law, Master of Science in Law, Master of Legal Studies, Master of Science in Legal Studies, Juris Master, and Master of Studies in Law.

== Overview ==
Offered within United States law schools, Master of Jurisprudence curriculum is often studied by those who want more legal knowledge and a deeper understanding of the American legal system, without a Juris Doctor (J.D.), which may include people who will work closely with lawyers or in law-adjacent activities. This can often include business professionals, those who work in government, or community activists.

Skills obtained in the Master of Jurisprudence can include understanding regulations and reading contracts, understanding complex legal issues, drafting policy, reviewing legal documents, and gaining a deeper understanding of the criminal justice system.

Some Master of Jurisprudence program offerings may have specific concentrations like Entertainment and New Media Law, IP and Technology Law, International and Comparative Law, Corporate and Business Law, or Health Law, or may be part of any number of dual degree programs.

The Master of Jurisprudence program typically ranges between 30 and 45 credit hours. Many Masters of Legal Studies degrees can be completed in 9 to 16 months. Some part-time programs offer longer timelines, up to 4 years. Some universities offer Juris Master's programs online.

While some classes may be shared with J.D. candidates, the Master of Jurisprudence does not prepare recipients to sit for the bar exam to practice law, but rather provides a better understanding of legal issues related to the recipient's chosen field.

For example, football player Chase Griffin reported he chose pursuing this degree, studying entertainment, media, and sports law because he wanted to understand the contract side of his talent and production work.

== See also ==
- Master of Laws
- Magister Juris
