= Kurt Wünsche =

German politician (1929–2023)

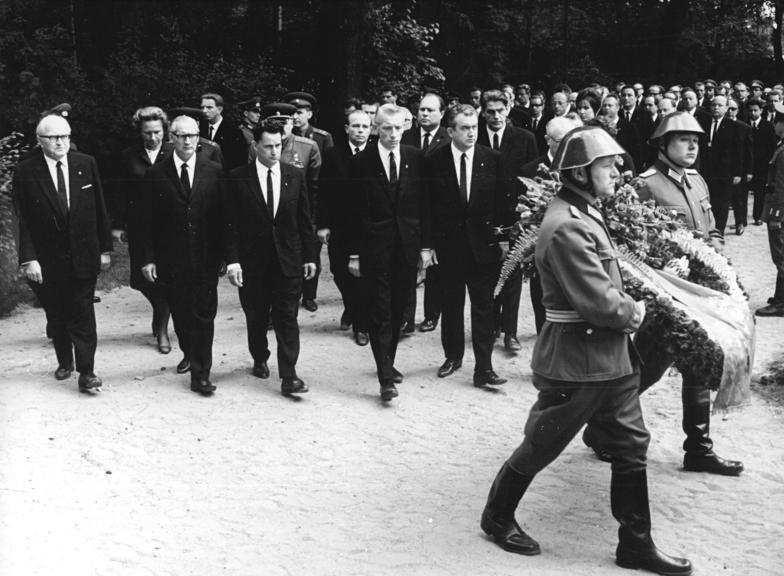
- Wünsche (front row, fifth from left) during the memorial service for the Langenweddingen level crossing disaster in 1967

Minister of Justice
- In office 11 January 1990 – 16 August 1990
- Minister-President: Hans Modrow; Lothar de Maizière
- Preceded by: Hans-Joachim Heusinger
- Succeeded by: Manfred Walther (acting)
- In office 14 July 1967 – 16 October 1972
- Chairman of the Council of Ministers: Willi Stoph
- Preceded by: Hilde Benjamin
- Succeeded by: Hans-Joachim Heusinger

Personal details
- Born: 14 December 1929 Obernigk, Province of Silesia, Free State of Prussia, Weimar Republic (now Oborniki Śląskie, Poland)
- Died: 14 June 2023 (aged 93) Berlin, Germany
- Party: Association of Free Democrats (1990)
- Other political affiliations: Liberal Democratic Party of Germany (1946–1990)
- Education: Deutsche Akademie für Staats- und Rechtswissenschaft „Walter Ulbricht“ (Dr. jur.)
- Occupation: Politician

Kurt Wünsche (14 December 1929 – 14 June 2023) was a German politician who was twice Minister of Justice of the German Democratic Republic.

== Biography ==
Wünsche grew up and received his schooling in Dresden. In 1946, he became a member of the Liberal Democratic Party of Germany (LDPD), and was until 1951 an official of the LDPD local district association (Kreisverbandes) in Dresden and the state association (Landesverbandes) of Saxony. From 1951 to 1954 he was the head of the LDPD department organising the party's central executive. After the events of the 17 June 1953, he was suspected as a foreign agent and temporarily detained by the Stasi. After 1954, he was a member of the LDPD Political Committee, and a Secretary and Deputy Secretary General, while in 1967 he was made deputy chairman of the LDPD.

Between 1954 and 1959, he completed a correspondence PhD in Law from the Walter Ulbricht Academy of Law and Political Science in collaboration with Manfred Gerlach; his thesis was entitled "Function and development of the Liberal Democratic Party of Germany in the multi-party system of the German Democratic Republic".

From 1954 to 1972, he was a LDPD deputy to the Volkskammer, first as a member of the Youth Committee, then of the Judiciary Committee, and finally of the Legal Committee. In 1965, he became one of the nine Deputy Chairmen of the Council of Ministers. In 1967, he succeeded Hilde Benjamin as Minister of Justice, a position he held until 1972.

After the fall of the Berlin Wall, Wünsche was again made Minister of Justice in the governments of Hans Modrow and Lothar de Maizière.

Wünsche died in Berlin on 14 June 2023, at the age of 93.
