= Diplom-Jurist =

Diplom-Jurist (Dipl.-Jur.) is a master's-level law degree awarded by some German universities.

== Background ==
Historically, German law students did not receive any academic degree upon completion of their curriculum. Instead, after usually four or five years of study, students would sit their First State Examination (Erstes Staatsexamen) in Law, which was administered by the ministry of justice of the respective state, not the university. More recently, however, some universities have begun to award their students a Diplom-Jurist upon passing the First State Examination, in order to indicate the equivalence of the education to a master's degree in other disciplines.

== Role for the legal profession ==
The "Diplom-Jurist" does not give the holder the right to work as, for instance, a fully qualified attorney (Rechtsanwalt) or a judge. The German legal education system requires examinees of the First State Examination to pass a two-year practical training period (Referendariat), at the end of which candidates sit the Second State Examination which, if passed, admits successful participants to the bar. As such, the "Diplom-Jurist" is a step towards qualifying as a lawyer, judge or prosecutor. Aside from that, the degree "Diplom-Jurist" is an academic degree in his own right. However, holders of the "Diplom-Jurist" degree may, of course, work as lawyers in unregulated legal professions where admittance to the bar is not required (e.g. in-house counsel).

Other universities have begun to award Magister Juris degrees following the same principles.
