= Bachelor's degree in law (Spain) =

The Spanish Bachelor's Degree in Law is the university academic degree conferred on those who have successfully completed a legal study process at a university. It is not the same as the Bachelor of Laws.

Spain offers types of bachelor's degree in law. One applies the Bologna Process and required 5 years of study with specialization and without legal internship. The later degree consumes 4 years, with internship and to specialize it is necessary to study a master's degree.

== Before Bologna ==
The bachelor's degree in Law for the Bologna Process was called Licenciatura en Derecho, it was an academic licentiate degree, a degree below that of a PhD. It was equivalent to a Master's degree in the anglophone system.

A Licenciatura typically required from 4 to 6 years of university courses, and had a typical credit workload of 300 to 400 credits. It required 5 years of university courses, and was established in 1953.

With the Bologna Process this licentiate degree was phased out at Spanish universities and was replaced by the system of the Grado (Bachelor's Degree, same name) and Master.

Prior to the Bologna Process, the master's degree was not considered an official academic degree in Spain, as the transition from undergraduate to postgraduate studies could only be done directly from a Licenciatura to doctoral studies.

== After Bologna ==
The Bologna Process established the system of the Grado and Master, earning the same academic level as the licentiate degree, but in two different degrees. The bachelor's degree in Law is called Grado en Derecho and requires 4 years of university courses.

This degree includes an optional legal internship (each university chooses in its degree planning), which is usually 6 ECTS credits.

=== Degree planning and Study Plan ===
The degree planning of the bachelor's degree in Law includes (in the Autonomous University of Barcelona for example):

==== 1st course ====
- Law Theory
- History of Law and Institutions
- Roman Law
- Introduction to Economics
- Civil Law I
- Constitutional Organisation of the State
- Constitutional Law I
- Criminal Law I
- Criminal Law II

===== 2nd course =====
- Civil Law II
- Civil Law III
- Criminal Law III
- Administrative Law I
- Administrative Law II
- European Union Law
- Public International Law
- Commercial Law I
- Constitutional Law II

==== 3rd course ====
- Commercial Law II
- Civil Law IV
- Finance Law and Tax Law I
- Finance Law and Tax Law II
- Procedural Law I
- Procedural Law II
- Employment and Social Security Law I
- Employment and Social Security Law II
- Administrative Law III

==== 4th course ====
- Private International Law
- International Protection of Human Rights
- Legal Internship
- Bachelor's Degree Final Project
