= Ministry of Justice (East Germany) =

The Ministry of Justice of the German Democratic Republic (German: Justizministerium der Deutschen Demokratischen Republik) was established in 1949 in East Germany and dissolved in 1990. Its duties were subsequently taken up by the federal Ministry of Justice of the united Germany, and the justice ministries of the six new federal states. The Ministry was housed at 93 Dorothea Street (Dorotheenstraße 93), the former offices of the Weimar and Nazi Interior Ministry. It published the journal Neue Justiz.

== History ==
After the Second World War and the collapse of Nazism in May 1945, Germany was divided into four zones of occupation, with the area that would become East Germany occupied by the Soviet Union. It was governed by the Soviet Military Administration in Germany, (German: Sowjetische Militäradministration in Deutschland (SMA)). On 17 July 1945, the SMAD issued Order No. 17, which established a judicial system in the Soviet occupation zone. The German Central Administration for Justice (German: Deutsche Zentralverwaltung für Justiz (DJV)) was subsequently founded in November 1945, with the SMAD appointing Eugen Schiffer as their first DJV president, though he was dismissed and replaced in 1948 with Max Fechner. In 1949, with the founding of the German Democratic Republic as a nominally independent state, the DJV was transformed into the Ministry of Justice.

Max Fechner was appointed the first Minister of Justice. By this time, the judiciary had already been brought into line with communist policy. Though mentioned in the Constitution of East Germany, there was no guarantee of judicial independence. The use of Volksrichter (English People's Judges) also helped to bring the courts closer to the SED. In 1953, the Länder of the Eastern Zone were abolished, and their Justice Ministries became part of the central ministry. After speaking critically of the prosecution of strikers in the protests of June 1953 in an interview with Neues Deutschland, Fechner was removed from office, denounced as an "enemy of the state and the party" and spent three years in prison and Stasi internment. He was replaced by Hilde Benjamin, who had presided over the show trials of the 1950s.

In 1963, the power of the ministry was weakened by a decree which transferred responsibility for control of the courts to the Supreme Court of East Germany, which reported directly to the State Council.

After the fall of the Berlin wall, the Ministry of Justice oversaw the transfer of its powers back to the states and the drafting of the Unification treaty under the supervision of Kurt Wünsche.

== List of Justice Ministers (1949–1990) ==
Name	In office	Council of Ministers (Cabinet)	Party
Max Fechner	11 October 1949 – 15 July 1953	Provisional government 1950-1954	SED
Hilde Benjamin	15 July 1953 – 14 July 1967	1954-1958; 1958–1963; 1963–1967	SED
Kurt Wünsche	14 July 1967 – 16 October 1972	1967–1971; 1971–1976	LDPD
Hans-Joachim Heusinger	16 October 1972 – 12 January 1990	1971–1976; 1976–1981; 1981–1986; 1986–1989; Modrow	LDPD
Kurt Wünsche	12 January 1990 – 16 August 1990	Modrow de Maizière	LDPD → BFD → non-partisan
Manfred Walther	16 August 1990 – 2 October 1990	de Maizière	non-partisan

== See also ==
- Council of Ministers of East Germany
