= Platform of European Memory and Conscience =

EU project to remember totalitarian governments

- Formation: 14 October 2011
- Type: Educational project of the European Union
- Purpose: Prevent intolerance, extremism, anti-democratic movements and the recurrence of any totalitarian rule in the future; Commemorating the victims of totalitarianism, fighting the manipulation of history
- Location(s): Prague and Brussels
- Members: 75 government agencies and NGOs from 15 EU Member States and 8 non-EU countries
- President: Marek Mutor
- Managing director: Wojciech Bednarski
- Executive Board: Antoine Arjakovsky, Toomas Hiio, Peter Keup, Biliana Kotsakova, Peter Rendek, Szylagi Zsolt, Paweł Ukielski,
- Website: memoryandconscience.eu

The Platform of European Memory and Conscience (Czech: Platforma evropské paměti a svědomí) is an educational project of the European Union bringing together government institutions and NGOs from EU countries active in research, documentation, awareness raising and education about the crimes of totalitarian regimes. Its membership includes 68 government agencies and NGOs from 15 EU member states and 8 non-EU countries including Ukraine, Albania, Georgia, Iceland, Moldova, the United Kingdom, the United States and Canada. Its members include the Institute of National Remembrance, the Berlin-Hohenschönhausen Memorial, the Stasi Records Agency and the Victims of Communism Memorial Foundation. The platform has offices in Prague and Brussels (formerly). The president of the platform was Göran Lindblad (politician) (2012-2017), later Łukasz Kamiński, former president of the Polish Institute of National Remembrance (2017-2022). In the current term of office Marek Mutor serves the president of Platform.

The platform was founded in Prague on the occasion of the summit of Prime Ministers of the Visegrád Group on 14 October 2011. The signing ceremony took place in the Lichtenstein Palace under the auspices of Czech prime minister Petr Nečas, Polish prime minister and president of the European Council Donald Tusk, and Hungarian prime minister Viktor Orbán. Its goal is described as helping "prevent intolerance, extremism, anti-democratic movements and the recurrence of any totalitarian rule in the future."

The initiative was originally proposed by the Institute for the Study of Totalitarian Regimes and the Government of the Czech Republic, and the 2008 Prague Declaration on European Conscience and Communism; on 2 April 2009, the European Parliament passed a resolution in favour of the initiative, and in June 2009, the Council of the European Union welcomed the initiative. The Platform of European Memory and Conscience was founded as an initiative of the Polish EU presidency in 2011, after the project had been promoted by the Czech EU presidency already in 2009 and by the Hungarian EU presidency in 2011. The secretariat of the Platform of European Memory and Conscience was originally hosted by the Institute for the Study of Totalitarian Regimes, and the platform has received a strategic grant from the International Visegrád Fund. The founding institutions included government agencies of the Czech Republic, Poland, Germany, Hungary, Romania, Lithuania, Estonia, and Latvia, as well as several NGOs. The organisation's strategic partners include the International Visegrád Fund and the Konrad Adenauer Foundation. The motto of the platform is "democracy matters."

== History ==
On 8 April 2008, the Slovenian EU Presidency and the European Commission organised the European Public Hearing on Crimes Committed by Totalitarian Regimes. The hearing called for the establishment of a foundation which would increase "public awareness at the EU level, develop cultural and educational projects and notably provide support to networking of national research institutions specialised in the subject of totalitarian experience, provide support for the European and national research and educational projects."

In June 2008, the international conference European Conscience and Communism was hosted by the Czech Senate Committee on Education, Science, Culture, Human Rights and Petitions. The resulting Prague Declaration on European Conscience and Communism called for the establishment of an Institute of European Memory and Conscience.

In 2009, Czech EU Presidency and the Institute for the Study of Totalitarian Regimes invited all member states to participate in the joint establishment of a Platform of European Memory and Conscience. Following a meeting in Prague in November 2008, representatives of 19 states and 12 partner institutions decided to establish a Working Group on the Platform of European Memory and Conscience, which was co-ordinated by the Institute for the Study of Totalitarian Regimes. As of 2011, the working group included 35 institutions and organisations from 19 European countries. The working group co-operates closely with the Reconciliation of European Histories Group, an all-party group in the European Parliament which is chaired by former European Commissioner Sandra Kalniete.

On 18 March 2009, the Czech EU Presidency hosted the European Public Hearing on European Conscience and Crimes of Totalitarian Communism: 20 Years After, as "the third step towards the establishment of a European Platform of Memory and Conscience to support the activities of institutions engaged in reconciling with totalitarian regimes in Europe."

On 2 April 2009, the European Parliament adopted (553:44:33) a resolution on European conscience and totalitarianism, which called "for the establishment of a Platform of European Memory and Conscience to provide support for networking and cooperation among national research institutes specialising in the subject of totalitarian history, and for the creation of a pan-European documentation centre/memorial for the victims of all totalitarian regimes."

In its 15 June 2009 conclusions, the EU General Affairs and External Relations Council welcomed the initiative to create the Platform of European Memory and Conscience and requested that the European Commission provide financial instruments for the activities.

In February 2010, the Working Group on the Platform of European Memory and Conscience hosted the international conference Crimes of the Communist Regimes in the Czech Senate and the Office of the Government of the Czech Republic under the auspices of Prime Minister Jan Fischer. The conference resulted in the adoption of the Declaration on Crimes of Communism, which called "upon EU member states to increase the awareness raising and education about crimes of communism," and stated that "the creation of the Platform of European Memory and Conscience, as supported by the European Parliament and the EU Council in 2009, must be completed at EU level."

In its 9–10 June 2011 conclusions on the memory of crimes committed by totalitarian regimes in Europe, the EU Justice and Home Affairs Council invited all interested parties to make use of existing EU programmes to establish a Platform of European Memory and Conscience.

The then-incumbent Polish EU Presidency founded the Platform of European Memory and Conscience with the participation of the governments and government institutions of a number of other EU countries on 14 October 2011. The Platform has received a strategic grant from the International Visegrád Fund.

== Executive board, Supervisory board, board of trustees and secretariat ==
The first president of the Platform of European Memory and Conscience was Göran Lindblad (former MP, Sweden, who drafted the Council of Europe resolution 1481); he was succeeded in 2016 by Łukasz Kamiński. The executive board members included Siegfried Reiprich (Stiftung Sächsische Gedenkstätten, Germany), Paweł Ukielski (Warsaw Rising Museum, Poland), Zsolt Szilágyi (Head of Cabinet of László Tökés, Vice-President of the European Parliament), and Toomas Hiio (Estonian Institute of Historical Memory). Andreja Valič Zver (Study Centre for National Reconciliation, Slovenia) was a member 2011–2015.

As of November 2020, the executive board consists of Dr. Wolfgang-Christian Fuchs, (DE), CEO of the German Union of Victims of Political Tyranny; Zsolt Szilágyi, (RO), political scientist; Toomas Hiio, (EE), Research Director, Estonian Institute of Historical Memory; Dr. Andreja Valič Zver, (SI), Director of the Slovenian Study Centre for National Reconciliation; Marek Mutor, (PL), Director, Remembrance and Future Institute; Prof. Antoine Arjakovsky (FR), Research Director at the Collège des Bernadins in Paris.

The platform has offices in Prague and Brussels (formerly). Neela Winkelmann served as managing director of the Platform between 2011 and 2018, and was succeeded by Peter Rendek.

As of November 2020, the supervisory board consists of Dr. Földváryné Kiss Réka, (HU), Chairperson of the Hungarian Committee of National Remembrance; Dr. Monika Kareniauskaitė, (LT), The Genocide and Resistance Research Centre of Lithuania; Dr. Paweł Ukielski, PO, Warsaw Rising Museum, Poland.

In 2012, the institution's board of trustees was elected. The first elected members were Sandra Kalniete MEP, Vytautas Landsbergis MEP, Tunne Kelam MEP, László Tökés MEP, and Milan Zver MEP. As of 2016, the Board of Trustees includes the original members as well as Paweł Robert Kowal MEP, Werner Schulz MEP, Monica Macovei MEP, Radvilė Morkūnaitė-Mikulėnienė MEP, former Czech senator Martin Mejstřík, former Czech deputy prime minister Alexandr Vondra, former Solidarność leader Wojciech Roszkowski MEP, historian Stéphane Courtois, journalist Anne Applebaum, former prime minister of Slovenia Janez Janša, and Czech actor Ondřej Vetchý. As of 2019, the Board of Trustees includes the original members as well as Göran Lindblad and former MEP Pavel Svoboda.

== Activities ==
The platform will co-ordinate the study of the totalitarian past on the European level. According to Daniel Herman, the director of the Institute for the Study of Totalitarian Regimes, one of the first joint projects might be a European history textbook.

When the countries of the former Eastern bloc entered the EU, their totalitarian communist past became a part of the European heritage

— Daniel Herman, Prague Daily Monitor

On 5 June 2012, the Platform of European Memory and Conscience and the Reconciliation of European Histories Group hosted the conference Legal Settlement of Communist Crimes in the European Parliament, under the auspices of Hans-Gert Pöttering and Jerzy Buzek, devoted to the issue of forming a special court tribunal for the crimes of communism, and "raising the issue of justice for the most serious crimes committed by the Communist dictatorships in Central and Eastern Europe from the national to a European level." The conference was a response "to growing calls for strengthened international justice formulated e.g., in the Prague Declaration on European Conscience and Communism." Following the conference, the Platform of European Memory and Conscience founded an international legal expert group to "work on a road map for establishing a supranational institution of justice" devoted to the "crimes committed by the Communist dictatorships."

As of November 2020, some of the main ongoing projects of the Platform of European Memory and Conscience include;

1) The ''Lest we Forget: Memory of Totalitarianism in Europe'' reader for secondary school students. The 1st edition was printed in 2013 and includes the stories of 30 people affected by totalitarianism from 16 European countries. Work on a 2nd edition with more (Western) European language and story additions is ongoing as of November 2020.

2) The international travelling exhibition ''Totalitarianism in Europe.''

3) The ''pan-European Memorial for the victims of totalitarianism in Brussels.''

4) The ''Justice 2.0'' restorative justice campaign towards surviving victims and perpetrators of Communism.

5) The ''Across the Iron Curtain'' educational board game.

6) A yearly Conference of the Members, as well as various other thematic conferences, seminars and workshops, such as the ''Past for the Future'' Conference, which was organised in cooperation with the Collège des Bernardins on 16 and 17 November 2020.

== Member institutions ==
Founding members

- Bulgaria: Hannah Arendt Center (membership frozen by members)
- Czech Republic: Institute for the Study of Totalitarian Regimes (membership cancelled by member in 2014), Security Services Archive,
- Estonia: Estonian Institute of Historical Memory, Unitas Foundation
- Germany: Berlin-Hohenschönhausen Memorial, Hannah Arendt Society, Stiftung Sächsische Gedenkstätten, the Federal Commissioner for the Stasi Records
- Hungary: Public Foundation for the Research of Central and East European History and Society, House of Terror Museum
- Latvia: The Occupation Museum Association of Latvia, the Occupation of Latvia Research Society
- Lithuania: Secretariat of the International Commission for the Evaluation of the Crimes of the Nazi and Soviet Occupation Regimes in Lithuania, Genocide and Resistance Research Centre of Lithuania
- Netherlands: Foundation History of Totalitarian Regimes and their Victims
- Poland: Institute of National Remembrance, Warsaw Rising Museum
- Romania: Institute for the Investigation of Communist Crimes and the Memory of the Romanian Exile
- Slovakia: Ján Langoš Foundation
- Slovenia: Study Centre for National Reconciliation
- Sweden: Institute for Information on the Crimes of Communism

Additional members

- Albania: Institute for Democracy, Media & Culture
- Bulgaria: Citizens' Initiative for Dismantling the Soviet Army Monument
- Canada: Black Ribbon Day Foundation
- Canada: Czech and Slovak Association of Canada
- Czech Republic: Centre for Documentation of Totalitarian Regimes
- Czech Republic: Confederation of Political Prisoners of the Czech Republic
- Czech Republic: Memory (Paměť)
- Czech Republic: Post Bellum
- Czech Republic: Political Prisoners.eu
- Czech Republic: Prague Academic Club 48
- Czech Republic: The Memory Traces
- Czech Republic: Union of Auxiliary Technical Units – Military Forced Labour Camps
- Estonia: Kistler-Ritso Eesti Foundation. Museum of Occupations
- France: Collège des Bernardins
- Italy: Gardens of the Righteous Worldwide (Gariwo)
- Germany: International Association of Former Political Prisoners and Victims of Communism
- Germany: Meetingpoint Music Messiaen
- Iceland: Icelandic Research Centre for Innovation and Economic Growth
- Latvia: Koknese Foundation
- Moldova: Center for the Study of Totalitarianism, State University of Moldova
- Portugal: Instituto Mais Liberdade
- Romania: The Memorial to the Victims of Communism and to the Anticommunist Resistance
- Romania: Timișoara Society
- Slovakia: Inconspicuous Heroes
- Slovakia: Nation's Memory Institute
- Slovakia: Truc sphérique
- Slovenia: Nova slovenska zaveza
- Ukraine: Center for Research on the Liberation Movement
- Ukraine: Foundation to Preserve the History of Maidan
- Ukraine: Mejlis of the Crimean Tatar People
- Ukraine: National Museum of the Holodomor-Genocide
- Ukraine: Ukrainian Institute of National Remembrance
- Ukraine: The State Archive of the Ukrainian Institute of National Remembrance
- USA: Joint Baltic American National Committee
- USA: Victims of Communism Memorial Foundation

== See also ==
- Prague Declaration on European Conscience and Communism
- Reconciliation of European Histories Group
- European Day of Remembrance for Victims of Stalinism and Nazism
- Council of Europe resolution 1481
- European Parliament resolution of 2 April 2009 on European conscience and totalitarianism
