= European Parliament resolution of 2 April 2009 on European conscience and totalitarianism =

European Union legislative resolution

The European Parliament resolution of 2 April 2009 on European conscience and totalitarianism was a resolution of the European Parliament adopted on 2 April 2009 by a vote of 533–44 with 33 abstentions, in which the European Parliament condemned totalitarian crimes and called for the recognition of "Nazism, Stalinism and fascist and Communist regimes as a common legacy" and for "an honest and thorough debate on their crimes in the past century." The resolution also called for several measures to strengthen public awareness of totalitarian crimes.

The resolution was co-sponsored by

- Tunne Kelam, Gunnar Hökmark, László Tőkés and Jana Hybášková on behalf of the European People's Party
- Annemie Neyts-Uyttebroeck and István Szent-Iványi on behalf of the Alliance of Liberals and Democrats for Europe
- Gisela Kallenbach and Milan Horáček on behalf of The Greens–European Free Alliance
- Hanna Foltyn-Kubicka, Wojciech Roszkowski, Ģirts Valdis Kristovskis, Adam Bielan, Roberts Zīle, Zdzisław Zbigniew Podkański, Inese Vaidere, and Mirosław Mariusz Piotrowski on behalf of the Union for Europe of the Nations

== The resolution ==
The resolution expressed its "respect for all victims of totalitarian and undemocratic regimes in Europe" and "[paid] tribute to those who fought against tyranny and oppression", "[underlined] the importance of keeping the memories of the past alive, because there can be no reconciliation without truth and remembrance", "[reconfirmed] its united stand against all totalitarian rule from whatever ideological background", "[condemned] strongly and unequivocally all crimes against humanity and the massive human rights violations committed by all totalitarian and authoritarian regimes", "[extended] to the victims of these crimes and their family members its sympathy, understanding and recognition of their suffering".

Having regard to its declaration of 23 September 2008 on the proclamation of 23 August as European Day of Remembrance for Victims of Stalinism and Nazism, the European Parliament called for its implementation by the Member States, "to be commemorated with dignity and impartiality." The resolution further called for "the establishment of a Platform of European Memory and Conscience to provide support for networking and cooperation among national research institutes specialising in the subject of totalitarian history, and for the creation of a pan-European documentation centre/memorial for the victims of all totalitarian regimes."

The resolution also called "on the Council and the Commission to support and defend the activities of non-governmental organisations, such as Memorial in the Russian Federation, that are actively engaged in researching and collecting documents related to the crimes committed during the Stalinist period."

== History and aftermath ==
The European Parliament resolution was preceded by the Council of Europe resolution 1481, the European Public Hearing on Crimes Committed by Totalitarian Regimes, the Prague Declaration on European Conscience and Communism, and the European Public Hearing on European Conscience and Crimes of Totalitarian Communism: 20 Years After, as well as by the European Parliament's 2008 proclamation of the European Day of Remembrance for Victims of Stalinism and Nazism.

The Organization for Security and Co-operation in Europe's Vilnius Declaration reiterated the call to take a "united stand against all totalitarian rule from whatever ideological background."

The Platform of European Memory and Conscience was established as an initiative of the Polish EU presidency in 2011.
