= European Public Hearing on European Conscience and Crimes of Totalitarian Communism: 20 Years After =

EU memorialisation event

The European Public Hearing on European Conscience and Crimes of Totalitarian Communism: 20 Years After was a European public hearing organised by the Czech Presidency of the European Union in the European Parliament on 18 March 2009. The hearing was described by the Presidency as "the third step towards the establishment of a European Platform of Memory and Conscience to support the activities of institutions engaged in reconciling with totalitarian regimes in Europe."

The hearing was hosted by the Deputy Prime Minister for European Affairs Alexandr Vondra and the Permanent Representative of the Czech Republic to the European Union Milena Vicenová on behalf of the Czech Presidency of the Council of the European Union, in cooperation with MEPs supporting the Prague Declaration.

The first session, chaired by Tunne Kelam MEP, included speeches by Pavel Žáček (Director, Institute for the Study of Totalitarian Regimes), Emmanuel Crabit (European Commission Directorate-General of Justice, Freedom and Security), Emanuelis Zingeris (Chairman, International Commission for the Evaluation of the Crimes of the Nazi and Soviet Occupation Regimes in Lithuania), Marius Oprea (Institute for the Investigation of Communist Crimes in Romania), Hans Altendorf (Office of the Federal Commissioner for the Stasi Records), Vasil Kadrinov (Hannah Arendt Center), Nicolas Werth (Institute for Contemporary History, CNRS), and Camilla Andersson (Institute for Information on the Crimes of Communism).

The second session, chaired by Jana Hybášková MEP, included speeches by Alexandr Vondra (Deputy Prime Minister for European Affairs of the Czech Republic), Ján Figeľ (European Commissioner for Education), Alejo Vidal-Quadras MEP (Vice President of the European Parliament), Jan Zahradil MEP, László Tökés MEP, and Sandra Kalniete (former European Commissioner).

The conclusions called for "the establishment of the Platform of European Memory and Conscience" and supported the proclamation of the European Day of Remembrance for Victims of Stalinism and Nazism.

The hearing was followed by a resolution of the European Parliament on European conscience and totalitarianism of 2 April 2009.
