= Reinhold Frank =

Lawyer executed for connection to 20th July Plot

Reinhold Frank (23 July 1896 – 23 January 1945) was a German lawyer. He did work for the resistance to Hitler's rule in Nazi Germany. He was sentenced to death in connection with the failed 20 July Plot.

== Life ==
Reinhold Frank was born the youngest of seven children in Bachhaupten in the Sigmaringen district. After serving in the military in the First World War, he studied law in Freiburg. He was a member of the Katholische Deutsche Studentenverbindung Arminia ("Catholic German Studentenverbindung Arminia") in the Cartellverband der katholischen deutschen Studentenverbindungen. After his time as a junior lawyer, he went to Karlsruhe and there, together with Dr. Honold, he ran a law practice. Owing to his Christian outlook, Nazi ideology did not sit well with Frank. He often found himself defending persecuted clients of all political and religious stripes. Among them were Catholic priests, who often ended up before the courts during the time of the Third Reich for having uttered criticisms of the régime. He also joined the Center Party, and was a member of the Karlsruhe City Council.

Frank belonged to the circle about the resistance group founded by Dr. Carl Friedrich Goerdeler. He had already agreed to stand ready in Baden to take a leading role in Germany's reconstruction, should the plot to overthrow Hitler actually succeed. It was therefore no wonder that, after the attempt on Hitler's life at the Wolf's Lair in East Prussia failed, Frank was arrested quite quickly, on 21 July 1944, the day after the attempt. Frank was found guilty by the Volksgerichtshof of high treason and treason. On 12 January 1945, he was sentenced to death. He was hanged on 23 January at Plötzensee Prison in Berlin.

== Legacy ==
In his honour, a memorial stone has been placed at the Hauptfriedhof ("Main Cemetery") in Karlsruhe. The street in Karlsruhe where the lawyers' chambers may be found bears his name. The Research Centre for German Resistance against National Socialism in Southwestern Germany, together with the University of Karlsruhe, the City of Karlsruhe, and the German Bundesarchiv, honours Frank yearly in the time around 20 July with a memorial reading.

== See also ==
- List of members of the 20 July Plot

== Sources ==
- Horst Rehberger Reinhold Frank. Rechtsanwalt in Karlsruhe, in: Der Widerstand im deutschen Südwesten 1933-1945. pub. by Michael Bosch und Wolfgang Niess, Stuttgart, 1984
- Michael Kißener, Der Widerstandskreis um den Karlsruher Rechtsanwalt Reinhold Frank, Speech on the occasion of the scientific symposium in the framework of the. European Culture Days, Karlsruhe 1994
- Reinhold Frank zum fünfzigsten Todestag, pub. by the City of Karlsruhe/Stadtarchiv, Karlsruhe 1995
- Uwe Schellinger, Dr. Reinhold Frank (1896-1945), Witnesses for Christ, Twentieth Century German Martyrology, pub. by H. Moll i.A. der Deutschen Bischofskonferenz, Paderborn u.a. 1999, 226
- Detlev Fischer: Anwälte im Widerstand gegen das NS-Regime, RuP 2002, 181
