= Senate district 38 – Mladá Boleslav =

Electoral district in the Czech Republic

38 – Mladá Boleslav
- inline Senate district of the Czech Republic

- The Mladá Boleslav district on a map
- Senator: Ondřej Lochman; STAN
- Region: Central Bohemian; Liberec
- District: Mladá Boleslav; Semily
- Electorate: 111,593
- Area: 1,201.43 km²
- Last election: 2024
- Next election: 2030

Senate district 38 – Mladá Boleslav is an electoral district of the Senate of the Czech Republic, which is formed by the entirety of the Mladá Boleslav District and parts of Semily District. From 2024, a STAN member Ondřej Lochman is representing the district.

== Senators ==
Year	Senator	Party
1996 (Note: Election for shortened four-year term)	Jarmila Filipová	ODS
2000	Jaroslav Mitlener	ODS
2006	Jaromír Jermář	ČSSD
2012	Jaromír Jermář	ČSSD
2018	Raduan Nwelati	ODS
2024	Ondřej Lochman	STAN

== Election results ==
=== 1996 ===
1996 Czech Senate election in Mladá Boleslav
Candidate	Party	1st round		2nd round	
Candidate	Party	Votes	%	Votes	%
Jarmila Filipová	ODS	14 943	39,67	20 202	59,36
Slavomír Klaban	ČSSD	5 941	15,77	13 831	40,64
Karel Skála	KSČM	4 981	13,22	—	—
Erich Novák	KDU-ČSL	4 568	12,13	—	—
Jan Kavan	Independent	2 445	6,49	—	—
Jaroslav Jelínek	Independent	1 710	4,54	—	—
Jaroslav Kroh	Independent	1 431	3,80	—	—
Vladimír Slobodzian	Independent	713	1,89	—	—
Jiří Čejka	SZ	691	1,83	—	—
Václav Svárovský	RSZML	244	0,65	—	—

=== 2000 ===
2000 Czech Senate election in Mladá Boleslav
Candidate	Party	1st round		2nd round	
Candidate	Party	Votes	%	Votes	%
Jaroslav Mitlener	ODS	9 255	25,59	12 814	50,21
Jiří Dienstbier	ČSSD	10 854	30,01	12 703	49,78
Jarmila Filipová	Independent	6 444	17,81	—	—
Karel Skála	KSČM	4 941	13,66	—	—
Dagmar Mocová	Independent	2 352	6,50	—	—
Ratibor Majzlík	4KOALICE	1 982	5,48	—	—
Jan Hutař	SŽJ	335	0,92	—	—

=== 2006 ===
2006 Czech Senate election in Mladá Boleslav
Candidate	Party	1st round		2nd round	
Candidate	Party	Votes	%	Votes	%
Jaromír Jermář	ČSSD	14 495	31,13	15 388	50,54
Jaroslav Mitlener	ODS	19 906	42,75	15 056	49,45
Václav Jakubec	KSČM	5 101	10,95	—	—
Jiří Čejka	SZ	2 932	6,29	—	—
Zdeněk Šverma	SNK ED	2 704	5,80	—	—
Jitka Hořejšová	„21“	966	2,07	—	—
Marcela Exnerová	NEZ/DEM	454	0,97	—	—

=== 2012 ===
2012 Czech Senate election in Mladá Boleslav
Candidate	Party	1st round		2nd round	
Candidate	Party	Votes	%	Votes	%
Jaromír Jermář	ČSSD	13 100	32,23	17 916	60,11
Adolf Beznoska	ODS	10 338	25,43	11 885	39,88
Václav Jakubec	KSČM	5 624	13,83	—	—
František Petrtýl	ANO 2011	3 010	7,4	—	—
Jiří Somberk	Suverenity	2 694	6,62	—	—
Karel Stanner	TOP 09, STAN	2 470	6,07	—	—
Jaroslav Mitlener	Svobodní	2 309	5,68	—	—
Zdeněk Šverma	SNK ED	676	1,66	—	—
Karel Horák	NÁR.SOC.	282	0,69	—	—
Jan Skácel	ČHNJ	135	0,33	—	—

=== 2018 ===
2018 Czech Senate election in Mladá Boleslav
Candidate	Party	1st round		2nd round	
Candidate	Party	Votes	%	Votes	%
Raduan Nwelati	ODS	16 317	33,86	11 504	61,96
Jiří Müller	ANO 2011	8 627	17,90	7 062	38,03
Daniela Weissová	Pirates	7 080	14,69	—	—
Ladislav Horák	ČSSD	6 970	14,46	—	—
Josef Jermář	KSČM	4 695	9,74	—	—
Miroslav Plch	TOP 09	2 336	4,84	—	—
Josef Nos	SPD	2 154	4,47	—	—

=== 2024 ===
2024 Czech Senate election in Mladá Boleslav
Candidate	Party	1st round		2nd round	
Candidate	Party	Votes	%	Votes	%
Ondřej Lochman	STAN, SLK	12 842	35,74	14 044	60,84
Igor Karen	ANO 2011	10 677	29,72	9 039	39,15
Raduan Nwelati	ODS, KDU-ČSL, TOP 09	5 286	14,71	—	—
Jiří Kobza	SPD, Tricolour	3 059	8,51	—	—
Jana Krumpholcová	Greens	2 782	7,74	—	—
Lukáš Nozar	SOCDEM	768	2,13	—	—
Václav Ort	JaSaN	510	1,41	—	—
