= Miroslav Lehký =

Miroslav Lehký (born 1947) is a Czech/Slovak human rights activist and civil servant, and the current deputy director (since 2007) and chairman of the advisory board of the Institute for the Study of Totalitarian Regimes. He was involved in founding the institute. He is signatory of the Charter 77 manifesto and a founding signatory of the Prague Declaration on European Conscience and Communism. During communist rule in 1980s, he was a co-organizer of the underground university in Bratislava. From 1990 to 1994, he was secretary to the Czechoslovak/Czech Helsinki Committee. He was employed by the Office for the Documentation and the Investigation of the Crimes of Communism from 1995 to 2003, and was involved in founding the Nation's Memory Institute in Slovakia in 2003. He studied theology from 1968 to 1970, but was not able to finish his studies due to political persecution by the communists.
