= Růžena Krásná =

Czech politician (1921–2012

Růžena Krásná (22 June 1921 – 13 July 2012) was a Czech liberal politician and human rights advocate, who was a political prisoner under the Communist regime in Czechoslovakia for eleven years. After World War II, she became regional secretary of the Czech National Social Party in Liberec. Arrested in 1949 by the Soviet occupiers, she was sentenced to death in a public show trial together with MP Emil Weiland. However, the sentence was commuted to life imprisonment and she remained a political prisoner until 1960. After the Velvet Revolution in 1989, she co-founded the Czechoslovak Confederation of Political Prisoners. In 1990, she was elected Chairman of the National Social Party – the Czechoslovak National Socialist Party. She is a founding signatory of the Prague Declaration on European Conscience and Communism.

Krásná died on 13 July 2012, at the age of 91.

== Recognitions ==
- Václav Benda Award (2010)
