= Estonian Institute of Historical Memory =

Foundation based in Estonia

The Estonian Institute of Historical Memory (Estonian: Eesti Mälu Instituut, lit. 'Estonian Memory Institute') is a non-governmental foundation that focuses on the investigation of war crimes and human rights violations committed by totalitarian regimes and research of totalitarian ideologies that created such regimes. The Institute aims to give the general public a comprehensive, objective and international overview of human rights violations and crimes committed by totalitarian regimes both in Estonia (during the German and Soviet occupations) and abroad.

In 2017, the Institute merged with the Unitas Foundation, which broadened the Institute’s focus, in that more attention is paid to international outreach.

== History ==
The Estonian Institute of Historical Memory has been investigating international crimes and human rights abuses committed by totalitarian regimes in Estonia as well as the ideologies that have given rise to such regimes since 1998.

Its predecessor was the Estonian International Commission for Investigation of Crimes Against Humanity (Inimsusvastaste kuritegude Uurimise Eesti Rahvusvaheline Komisjon), founded by President Lennart Meri in 1998. The Commission investigated the crimes against humanity committed in Estonia during the German and Soviet occupations based on the definitions of genocide, crimes against humanity and war crimes in the 1998 Rome Statute of the International Criminal Court.

The establishment of the Estonian Institute of Historical Memory was initiated by the Estonian President Toomas Hendrik Ilves in 2008. The Institute was established by Leon Glikman, Rein Kilk, Jaan Manitski, Tiit Sepp, Hannes Tamjärv and Indrek Teder.

The Estonian Institute of Historical Memory surpasses the framework of the Estonian International Commission for Investigation of Crimes Against Humanity in that it selected the Universal Declaration of Human Rights adopted by the United Nations in 1948, as the legal basis for its historical research. The Institute therefore also collects data about such human rights violations committed during the Soviet occupation that are not crimes against humanity by legal definition.

In 2017, the Institute merged with the Unitas Foundation into a new organization that combines academic research concerning inhumane regimes (previously the responsibility of the Estonian Institute of Historical Memory) with public awareness activities (previously the responsibility of the Unitas Foundation). The new organization continues with the name Estonian Institute of Historical Memory.

== Main activities ==
=== International Museum for the Victims of Communism ===
The Estonian Institute of Historical Memory leads a project which aims to establish an International Museum for the Victims of Communism and an accompanying international research centre in Patarei Prison by 2025. Patarei was used by both Soviet and Nazi regimes throughout the 20th century and is one of the main symbols of Soviet political terror for Estonians. The museum will introduce crimes committed by both the Soviet and Nazi regimes, with the main focus on the machinery, ideology and crimes of communist regimes, moving from a local overview, to the events in Europe, to a global scale. The museum is planned to an approximately 5,000 square meter area in the eastern part of the building, where authentic prison cells, an execution chamber, corridors, prisoners’ walkways etc have preserved.

=== Victims of Communism 1940–1991 Memorial ===
On 23 August 2018, Estonia's Victims of Communism 1940–1991 Memorial was inaugurated in Tallinn by Estonian president Kersti Kaljulaid. The memorial's construction was financed by the state and the memorial itself is being managed by the Estonian Institute of Historical Memory

=== Online databases ===
The Institute manages and develops the Victims of Communism Memorial Database, and the Nazism victims’ database. The research concerning the victims is ongoing and the databases are constantly updated.

As a consequence of communist terror, Estonia lost approximately 20% of its one million population, of whom more than 75,000 were murdered, imprisoned or deported. The majority of victims died far from home and their remains lie in unmarked graves in unknown locations. The Victims of Communism Memorial in Maarjamäe, built on the occasion of Estonia’s centennial in 2018, displays the known names of more than 22,000 Estonian people who lost their lives under the communist regime. The lists of victims were a result of years of research conducted by the Memento Society and the Estonian Institute of Historical Memory. An integral part of the memorial is an electronic database, which is managed and administered by the Institute and lists more than 100,000 names. The database includes information on persons who perished due to communist terror and persons who were released from imprisonment or banishment, along with data on those victims whose fate is not known. The database provides basic information on persons (name, year of birth and death), as well as data on his/her family members that were subject to repression. The database is an important source of information for researchers and the families of the repressed. The Institute updates the Victims of Communism Memorial Database regularly in accordance with research results and in cooperation with the victims’ families.

On 23 August, the European Day of Remembrance for Victims of Stalinism and Nazism, also known as Black Ribbon Day, additional memorial plaques are annually unveiled that bear the names of those victims of communism whose fate has been uncovered since the memorial's opening in 2018. The true figures and details of all those from Estonia who disappeared during the mass deportations of the 1940s and in other repressions during the Soviet occupation of Estonia may never be fully known.

=== Research and publications ===
The Institute’s research concerns the emergence and spread of communist ideology and its different manifestations as a state ideology aimed at the violent seizure of power and the establishment of the so-called dictatorship of the proletariat, and also its legal political activity in democratic societies. The objects of research are the methods of communist propaganda in the era of underground subversive activity as well as in communist regimes, and the means for securing communist rule. An important field of research is the influence of communist ideology and the legacy of the rule of communist regimes in democratic societies in the 21st century. The Institute holds scholarship competitions and supports scholars (social scientists, primarily historians, political scientists and lawyers) in corresponding fields of research. The Institute’s researchers participate in international conferences as well as in international research projects. The Institute also publishes its academic research and proceedings in English.

=== Exhibitions ===
The Institute has curated various exhibitions, most notably the exhibition area Communism is Prison in Patarei Prison in Tallinn, which is the first stage of the development of the future International Museum for the Victims of Communism. The Institute has also compiled many temporary exhibitions, most recently Communism and Terror and The “Liberator” Arrived, both of which are also available online.

=== Education and public awareness ===
The Institute manages and develops several educational platforms, such as the website on Holocaust in Occupied Estonia 1941–1944, Klooga concentration camp and Holocaust Memorial and Bridging the Baltic history education portal.

The Institute offers educational and training programmes for teachers, youth workers, pupils, and university students. It also publishes and distributes various educational materials that inform the general public about the history of communist regimes.

The Institute organizes annual commemorative events dedicated to the victims of crimes against humanity and the resistance against inhumane regimes on the occasion of the International Holocaust Remembrance Day, March deportation, June deportation, the Black Ribbon Day and the Resistance Fighting Day.

The Institute hosts at least one international scholarly conference a year. In 2019, the Institute hosted the conference Necropolis of Communist Terror in cooperation with the Memorial Research and Information Centre (St. Petersburg). The conference was dedicated to the issues of locating, researching, memorialising and legally establishing mass burial sites of victims of state terror in Eastern European and former communist countries. On 23 August 2018, the European Day of Remembrance of the Victims of Totalitarian Regimes, an international conference Utopia unachieved despite millions victimised? Communist crimes and European memory was held. The conference addressed the topic of crimes committed by communist regimes and their consequences and the possibility of a common European culture of remembrance.

=== Collect Our Story ===
Collect Our Story (Estonian: Kogu Me Lugu, also translates as We're Collecting The Story and Our Entire Story) is an oral history portal and video repository launched in 2013. The website is managed and developed by the Estonian Institute of Historical Memory. The portal collects, preserves and shares family stories of Estonians from around the world, focusing on the memories of people who were repressed by the Soviet or Nazi regimes, people who escaped Estonia during the occupations of said regimes or arrived in Estonia as a result of the occupations. The collected memories are used for developing educational materials, research, and raising public awareness in Estonia and elsewhere.

=== CommunistCrimes.org ===
CommunistCrimes.org is a database that focuses on the facts and research of communist ideology and regimes from a global perspective. The aim of the portal is to raise awareness about the crimes against humanity committed by communist regimes worldwide. The Estonian Institute of Historical Memory cooperates internationally with independent historians and researchers whose subject area is communist regimes and who endeavour to define how and to what extent human rights were globally violated.

== Affiliations with other organisations ==
The Institute is a member institution of the Platform of European Memory and Conscience.

Estonia has also joined the European Network of Remembrance and Solidarity (ENRS) as an observer member. The Estonian Institute of Historical Memory is Estonia’s partnership coordinator with the ENRS.

The Institute also cooperates closely with the Museum of the Occupation of Latvia, Genocide and Resistance Research Centre of Lithuania, Federal Foundation for the Study of Communist Dictatorship in East Germany and the Memorial Research and Information Centre (St. Petersburg) as well as several other organizations and public figures.
