= Martin Mejstřík =

Czech politician (born 1962)

Senator from Prague 1
- In office 2 November 2002 – 2 November 2008
- Preceded by: Václav Fischer
- Succeeded by: Zdeněk Schwarz

Personal details
- Born: 30 May 1962 (age 64) Kolín, Czechoslovakia
- Party: Independent
- Education: Academy of Performing Arts in Prague

Martin Mejstřík (born 30 May 1962) is a Czech politician and human rights activist.

== Biography ==
Mejstřík is notable for his role as a student leader during the Velvet Revolution that led to the ousting of the Communist regime in Czechoslovakia in November 1989. He served as a Senator in the Senate of the Parliament of the Czech Republic from 2002 to 2008, representing Prague 1 as an independent, and was a member of the Senate Committee on Education, Science, Culture, Human Rights and Petitions.

Mejstřík is a founding signatory of the Prague Declaration on European Conscience and Communism (and the co-organizer, with Jana Hybášková, of its preceding conference) and the Declaration on Crimes of Communism. He was also one of the politicians proposing the creation of the Institute for the Study of Totalitarian Regimes. In 2007, he proposed a ban on "communist and all totalitarian propaganda and symbols".
