= Göran Lindblad (politician) =

Swedish politician (born 1950)

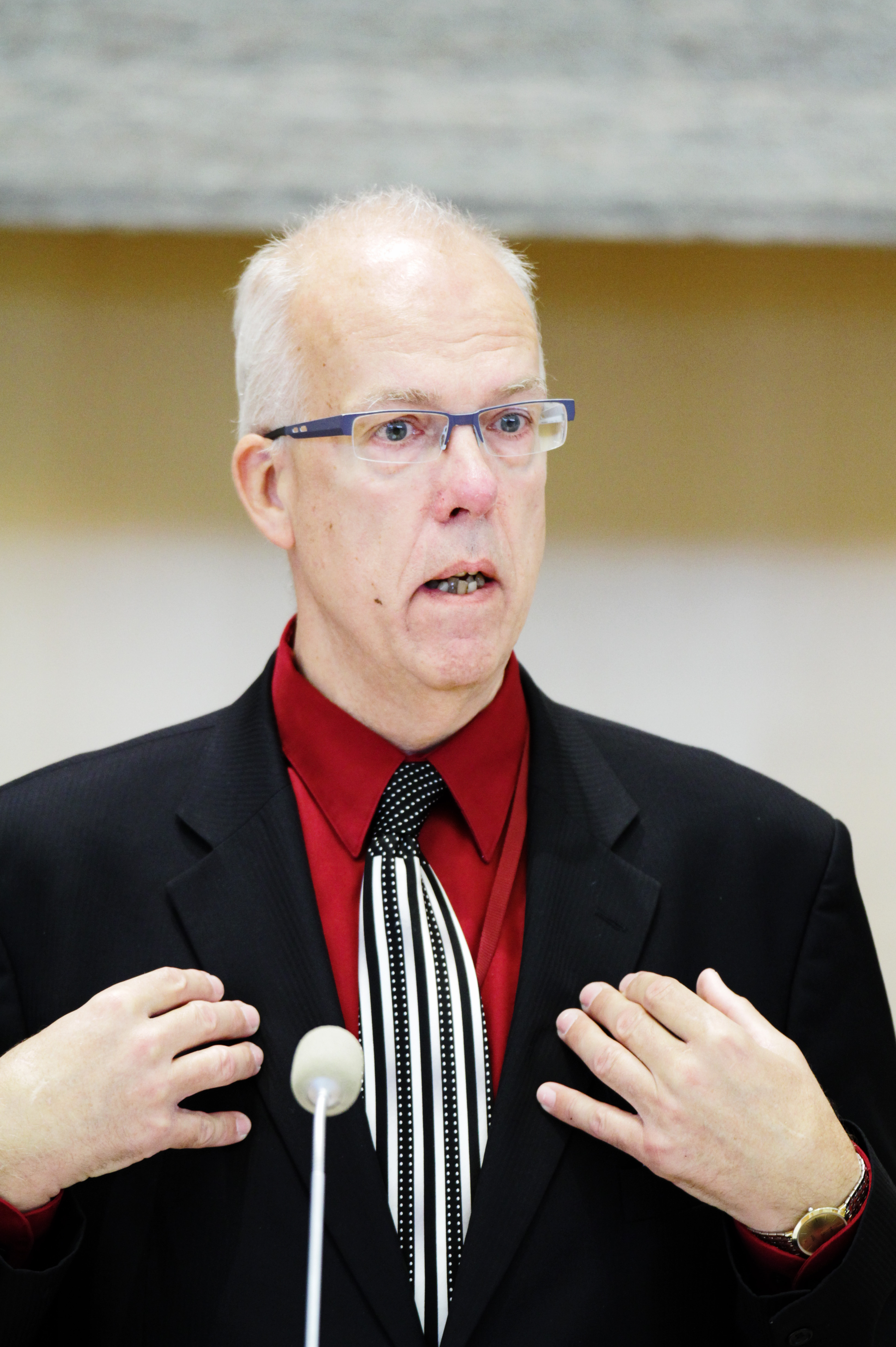

Member of Parliament for Gothenburg
- In office 1997–2010

Vice President of the Parliamentary Assembly of the Council of Europe
- In office 2007–2010

President of the Platform of European Memory and Conscience
- Incumbent
- Assumed office 2011

Personal details
- Born: 12 January 1950 (age 76)
- Party: Moderate Party

Lars Göran Axel Lindblad (born 12 January 1950 Gothenburg) is a Swedish politician and member of the Moderate Party. He served as a member of the Swedish parliament 1997–2010, representing the constituency of Gothenburg. He served as a replacement member of parliament 1993–1997, and again since 2010. Lindblad has chaired the Swedish delegation to the Parliamentary Assembly of the Council of Europe (PACE) and served as Vice President of PACE as well as chair of the Political Affairs Committee. He was a member of the Parliamentary Assembly 2004–2010. In October 2011, he was elected President of the Platform of European Memory and Conscience.

Lindblad has advocated a more humane refugee and migration policy, and is involved in charitable work to improve conditions for refugees. Lindblad is known internationally for his work to promote democracy and human rights. He served as the Council of Europe rapporteur on crimes of totalitarian communist regimes. As such, he drafted and championed the resolution Need for international condemnation of crimes of totalitarian communist regimes, which led to the Council of Europe resolution 1481. It was the first time communism was condemned by an international body of parliamentarians. Lindblad has stated: "Growing up in Sweden, so close to the Evil Soviet Empire, I have always been against communism."

By profession, Lindblad is a dentist, graduating at University of Gothenburg in 1977. He was Vice President of the National Union of Students 1976–77. He is married and has four children.

Lindblad is a founding signatory of the Prague Declaration on European Conscience and Communism.
