= Eduard Stehlík =

Czech historian and writer (born 1965)

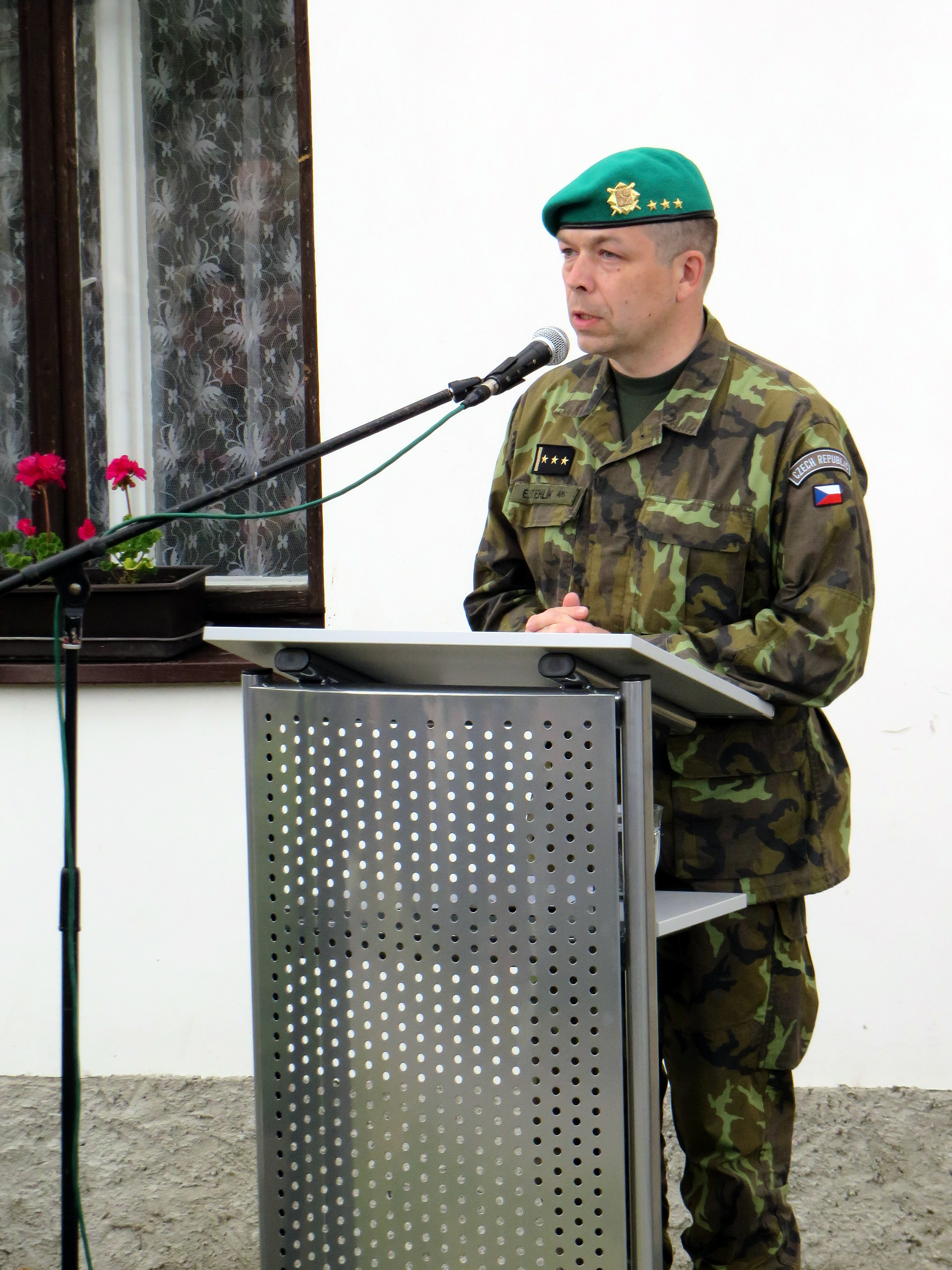
- Stehlík in 2014
- Born: 30 March 1965 (age 61); Prague, Czechoslovakia
- Occupations: Historian, writer
- Notable work: Lidice - Příběh české vsi; Lexikon tvrzí československého opevnění z let 1935-38; Pevnosti a opevnění v Čechách, na Moravě, a ve Slezsku

Eduard Stehlík (born 30 March 1965) is a Czech historian and writer, and Vice Director at the Institute for Military History in Prague.

Stehlík graduated from the Faculty of Arts, Charles University, and has worked at the Institute for Military History since 1989, focusing on Czechoslovak military history. He has also cooperated with Czech Television. He was declared an honorary citizen of Lidice on 27 October 2006. Stehlík is a founding signatory of the Prague Declaration on European Conscience and Communism.

On 2 June 2020, Stehlík announced candidacy for the Senate as a Nominee of the Civic Democratic Party.
