= Jana Hybášková =

Czech politician and diplomat

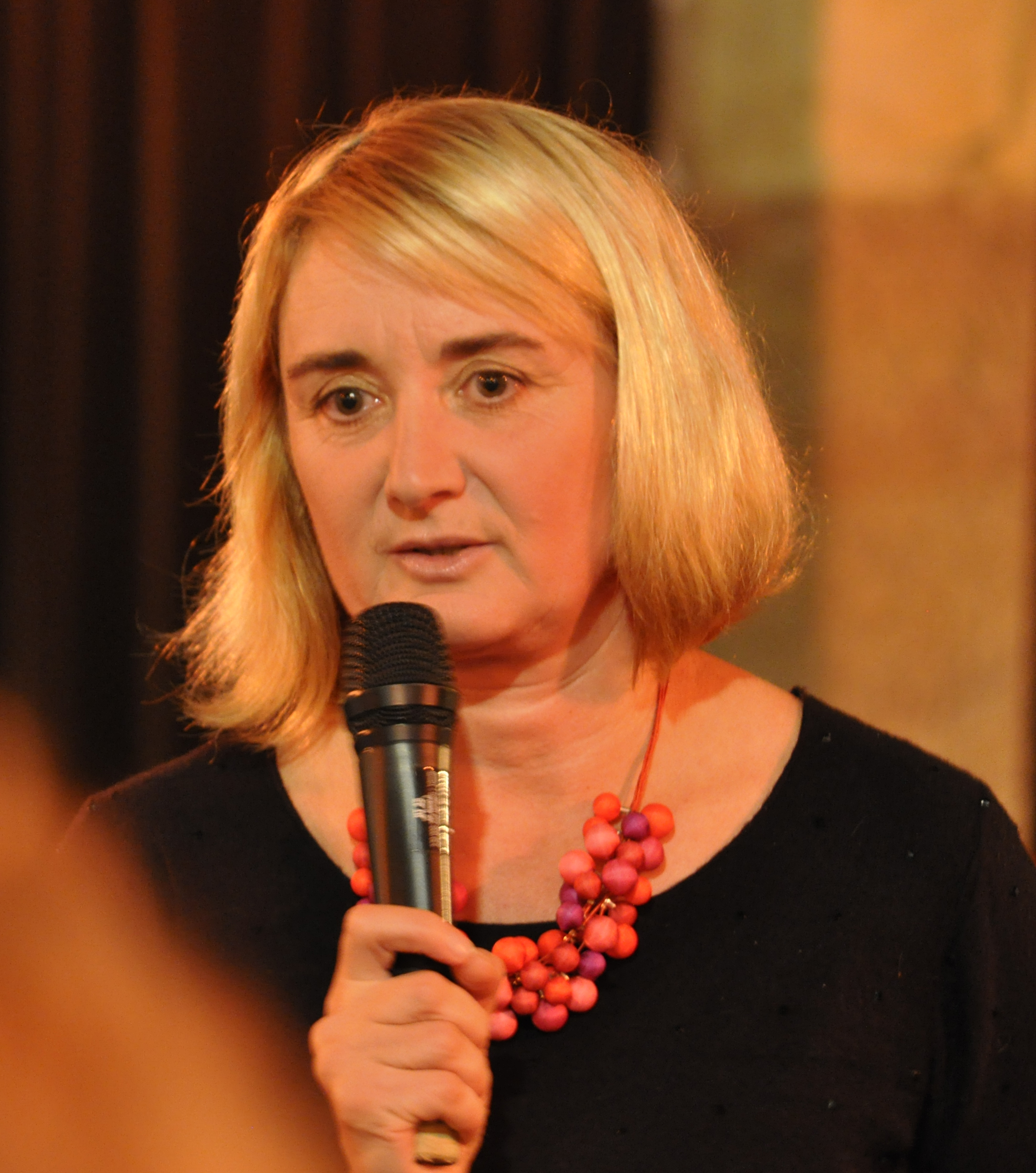

Ambassador of the European Union in Namibia
- In office 2015–2019
- Preceded by: Raúl Fuentes Milani
- Succeeded by: Sinikka Antila

Ambassador of the European Union in Iraq
- In office 2011–2015
- Preceded by: Ilkka Uusitalo
- Succeeded by: Patrick Simonnet

Member of the European Parliament for Czech Republic
- In office 2004–2009

Personal details
- Born: 26 June 1965 (age 60) Prague
- Party: SNK European Democrats, European Democratic Party, European People's Party

Jana Hybášková (born 26 June 1965 in Prague) is a Czech politician and diplomat, who served as Ambassador of the European Union in Iraq from 2011 to 2015, and Namibia from 2015 to 2019. Prior to that, she was a Member of the European Parliament for the SNK European Democrats from 2004 to 2009. She was the chair of the European Democratic Party (EDS) from 2008 to 2010.

== Biography ==
Hybášková graduated in Arabic at Charles University, earning a doctorate from the university's Faculty of Philosophy and Arts in 1989, and worked at the Foreign Ministry of Czechoslovakia and then the Czech Republic from 1991 to 1997. She was the Czech Ambassador to Slovenia from 1997–2001, and then briefly an adviser to the State Secretary for European Affairs, before becoming Ambassador to Qatar and Kuwait (2002–2004).

As a Member of the European Parliament, she was a member of the Committee on Foreign Affairs, a substitute on the Committee on Budgets and chairwoman of the European delegation for relations with Israel. She is also a member of the Steering Committee of the World Movement for Democracy. She has been critical of the Iranian government and President Mahmoud Ahmadinejad, and has advocated closer relations between Israel and Europe.

She is a founding signatory of the Prague Declaration on European Conscience and Communism, and the co-organizer (with Senator Martin Mejstřík) of its preceding conference. She co-sponsored the European Parliament resolution of 2 April 2009 on European conscience and totalitarianism on behalf of the European People's Party.

== Decorations ==
- Holder of the decoration 'Záslužný kříž ministra obrany ČR II stupně' (Cross of Merit of the Minister of Defence of the Czech Republic, Second Class)

== See also ==
- 2004 European Parliament election in the Czech Republic
