= Political Prisoners.eu =

Czech association

Political Prisoners.eu Association
- Spolek Političtí vězni.cz
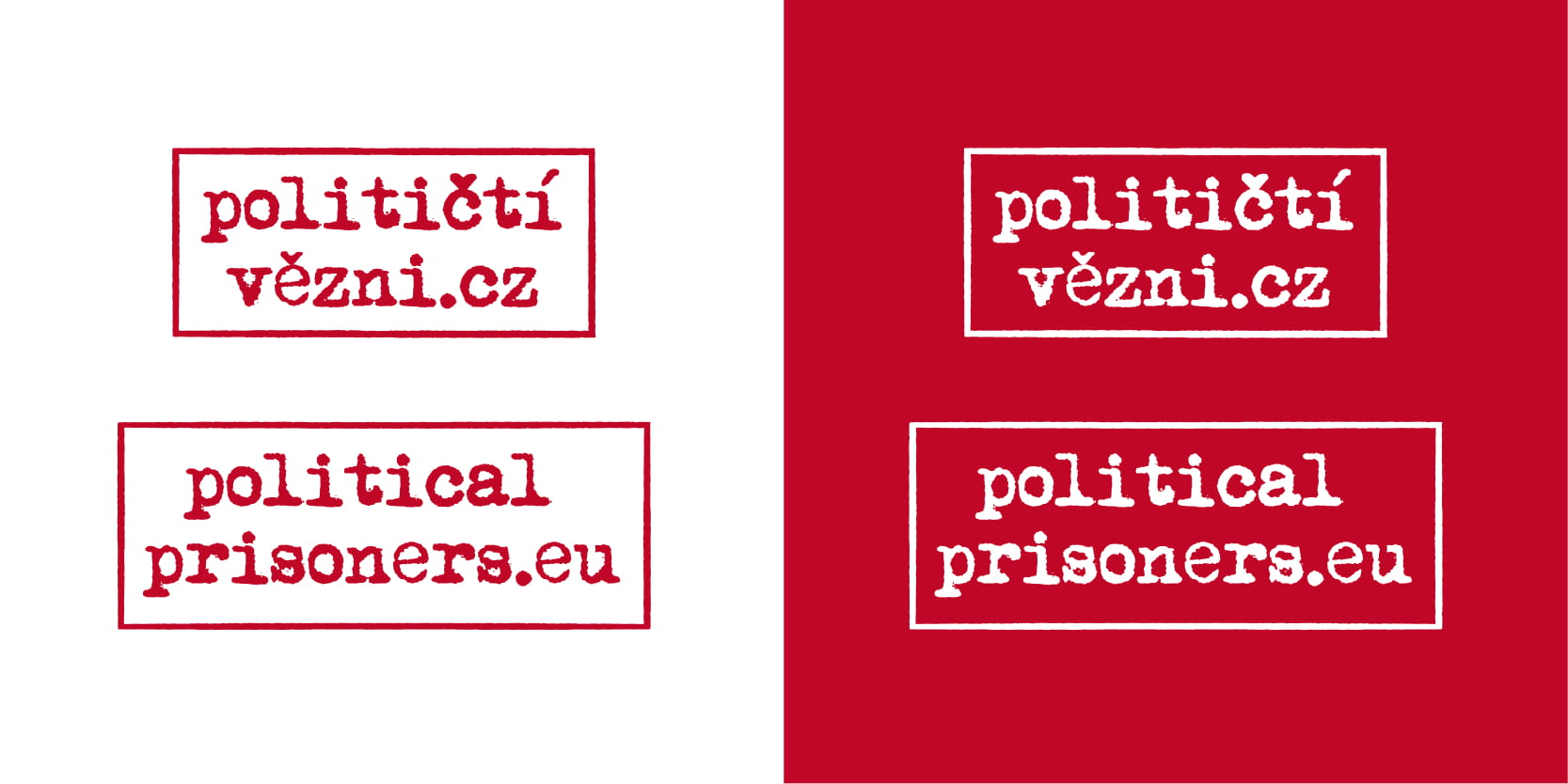
- Formation: 2010; 15 years ago
- Type: Educational project
- Location: Prague
- Director: Tomáš Bouška
- Website: www.politicalprisoners.eu

Political Prisoners.eu Association (Czech: Spolek Političtí vězni.cz) is a Czech association mainly focusing on the issue of political prisoners of the communist regime in Czechoslovakia. The association has collected the oral historical testimonies of former political prisoners and tries to popularize their history in various ways. Among other things, it has produced several publications and restored the educational trail 'Jáchymov Hell' in Jáchymov. The organisation is a member of the Platform of European Memory and Conscience.

== Activity ==
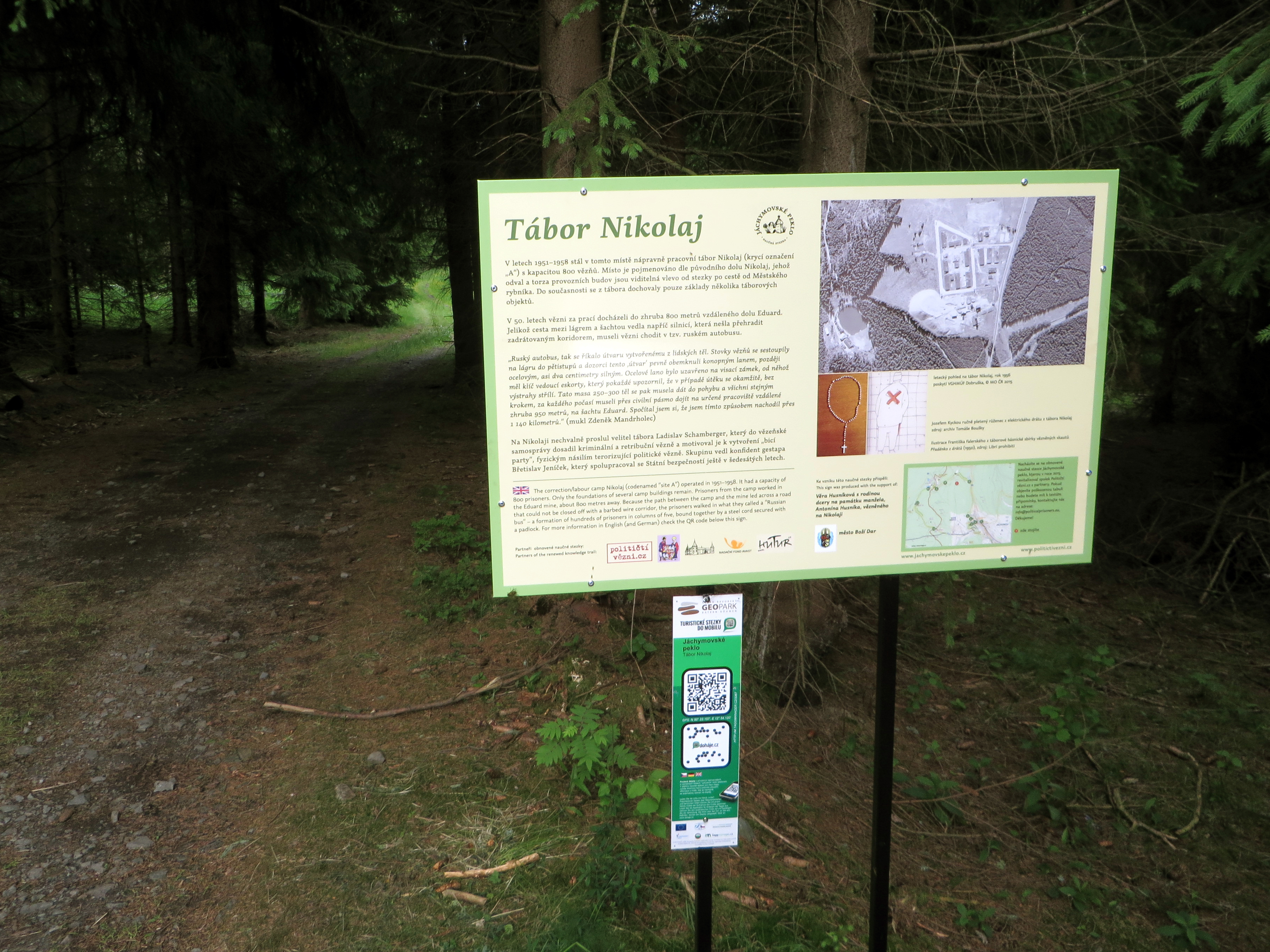
An information panel of the nature trail 'Jáchymov Hell' at the site of Nikolai labor camp

The organisation was established as an informal student initiative with the intent to record interviews of former political prisoners of the communist regime. In 2008, the association's website was launched and an English book detailing the stories of imprisoned men and women was published, followed by an expanded Czech edition the following year. In 2010, the informal initiative was transformed into a civic association. In the same year, the association participated for the first time in the Forum 2000 Conference. In 2012, a panel focused on imprisoned women was prepared for the same event and a panel on coping with the past in 2013. In 2014 it participated in the Velvet Enlightenment Festival, focusing on the fate of women imprisoned in the 1950s and their children.

In 2011, members of the association created the documentary K. Ch. - Portrait of a political prisoner (directed by Tomáš Bouška) about a former political prisoner, Karla Charvátová. The documentary premiered in Světozor cinema on 17 November 2011.

The association pays great attention to former labor camps, especially those in the Jáchymov region. Among other activities there occasionally organizes guided tours, for example in 2012 and 2013 for participants in the educational project Traces of Totalitarianism. In 2014, the association cooperated with the Department of Geography of the Faculty of Science of UJEP in Ústí nad Labem on the creation of a virtual 3D model of the Jáchymov labor camp Svornost.

In 2015, the association renewed the 'Jáchymov Hell' Trail, which leads through the former labor camps at the uranium mines operated in the Jáchymov area. The funds for the reconstruction of the trail were partially crowdfunded with the support of The Tap Tap. The renewed trail was inaugurated on 27 June 2015 on the Remembrance Day of the victims of the communist regime in the presence of former political prisoners Hana Truncová, Zdeněk Mandrholec, and František Wiendl. In the evening, the band Tap Tap performed a gala concert in Jáchymov. For the reopening of the trail in cooperation with wheelchair users and physically handicapped musicians, the association advanced among the five finalists of the 'Mosty' 2015 Award (in the category of a non-state entity) awarded by the National Council of Persons with Disabilities.

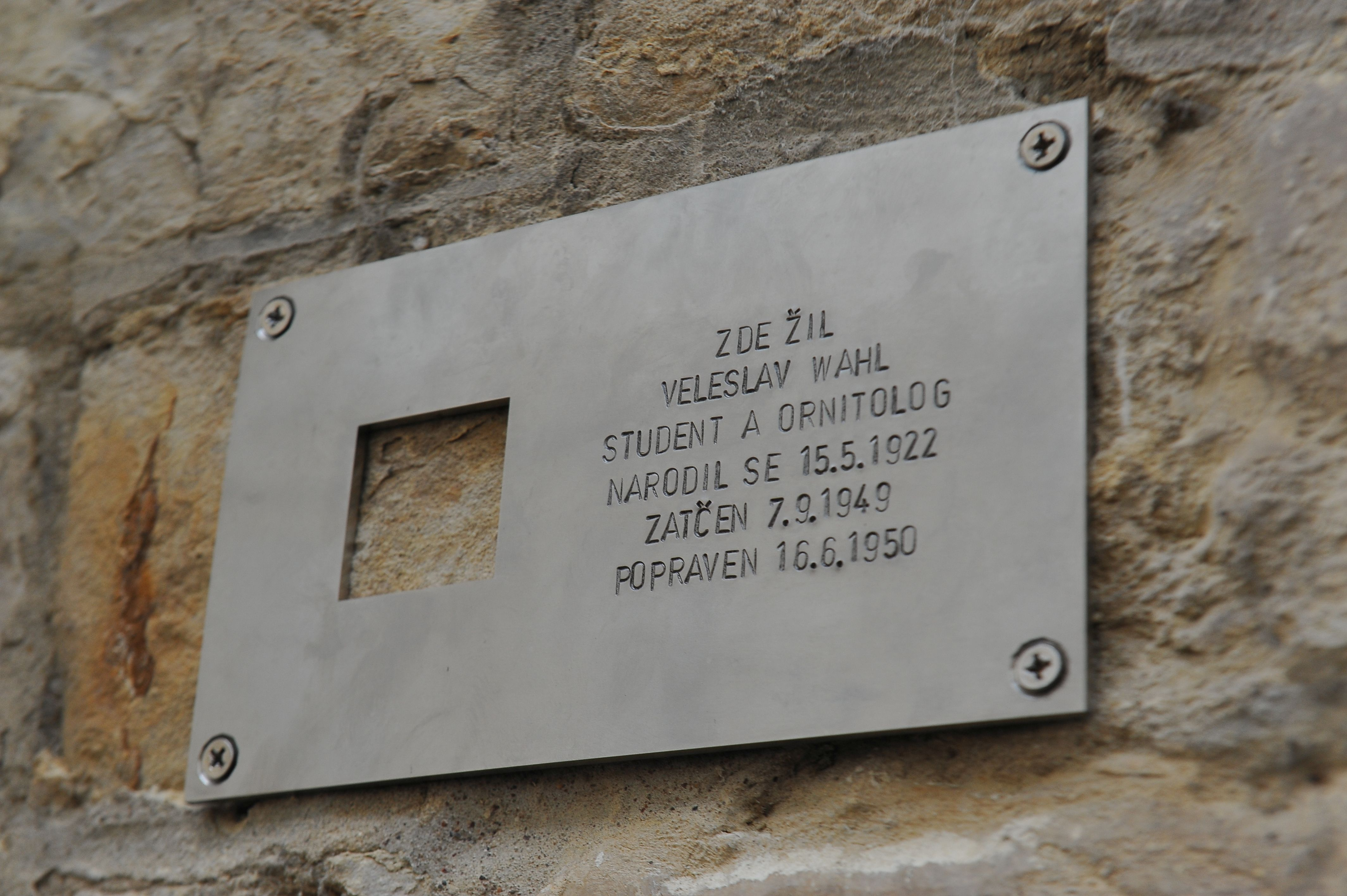
The Last Address memory plague for executed student Veleslav Wahl

In 2015, the association was involved in the preparation of the Czech part of the Last Address project, commemorating the victims of the communist regime. In 2016, the association cooperated in organizing the international conference Jáchymov in the 20th century - The Place of Memory of European History in Jáchymov. In 2017, the association began to operate guided tours around places of Communist history.

In 2019, the association began working with EUTIS and BBAG Potsdam, a public benefit organization, in an educational project aimed at transferring knowledge of modern history through places of memory.

== Books ==
- Czechoslovak political prisoners: Life stories o 5 male and 5 female victims of Stalinism (2008)
- Českoslovenští političtí vězni: Životní příběhy (2009) ISBN 978-80-254-5825-9.
- Czechoslovak political prisoners: Life stories o 5 male and 5 female victims of Stalinism (2016, Second amended edition)
