= European Democratic Party (Czech Republic) =

European Democratic Party Evropská demokratická strana
- Leader: Jana Hybášková
- Founded: 2008
- Dissolved: 2010
- Headquarters: Prague
- Ideology: Conservative liberalism Pro-Europeanism
- Political position: Centre-right
- Colours: Blue and Yellow

Website
- www.eds2009.cz

The European Democratic Party (Czech: Evropská demokratická strana, EDS) was a Czech liberal conservative, Pro-European political party founded in November 2008, and chaired by Jana Hybášková.

== Formation ==
EDS was registered with the Czech Ministry of the Interior in the week prior to 27 November 2008. It was announced to the public at the National Gallery in Prague on 26 November 2008.

== Position ==
EDS focusses on the economic development of the Czech Republic, the adoption of the euro and energy security. It is for European integration and adopting European law in Czech legislation.

== Nomenclature ==
EDS shares a name with the European political party called the European Democratic Party, but it is not connected with it.

== People ==
EDS personnel include:

- President: Jana Hybášková, former MEP.
- Jana Ryšlinková, former Deputy Minister for Regional Development and member of the Prague council.
- Věra Jourová, former Minister for Regional Development.
- Jiří Šedivý, former army Chief of General Staff. The involvement of former senior members of the military in Czech politics is regarded as unusual.

== Supporters ==
EDS supporters include:

- Václav Havel, former President of the Czech Republic.
- Ivan Wilhelm, Czech nuclear physicist and former Rector of Charles University in Prague.
