= Milan Horáček =

German politician (born 1946)

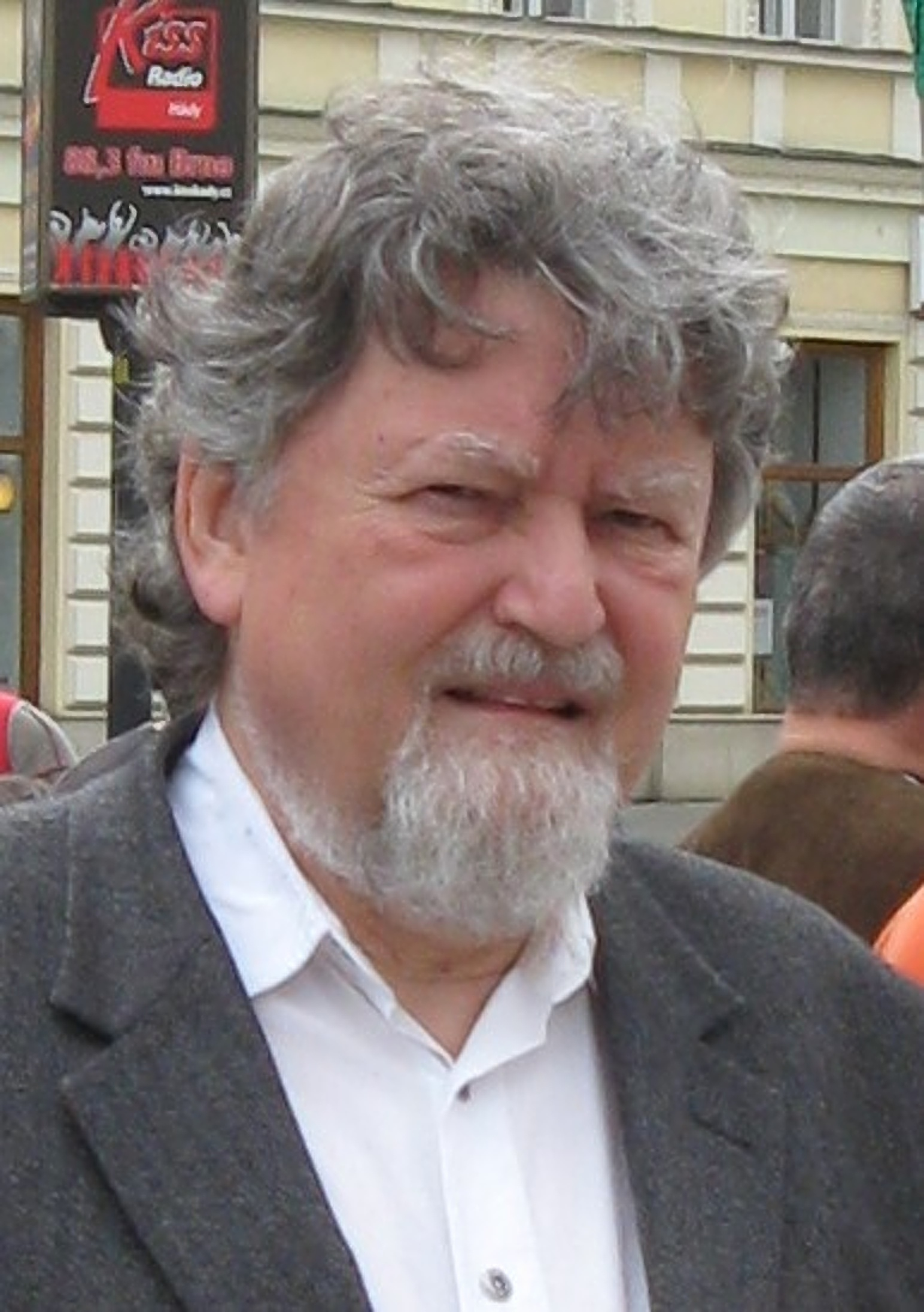

Member of the Bundestag
- In office 1983–1985

Member of the European Parliament for Germany
- In office 2004–2009

Personal details
- Born: 30 October 1946 (age 79) Velké Losiny, Czechoslovakia
- Party: Alliance 90/The Greens, European Greens

Milan Horáček (born 30 October 1946) is a Czech-born German politician, a founding member of the German Green Party, a former member of the Bundestag (1983–1985) and a former Member of the European Parliament (2004–2009).

Horáček was born in Velké Losiny, Czechoslovakia. From 1965 to 1967 his political activism got him into trouble with the Czechoslovak communist regime, and he was arrested several times. After the suppression of the Prague Spring in 1968, he fled from Czechoslovakia and settled in West Germany. There he worked in industry and for a trade union magazine. From 1976 to 1981 he studied political science in Frankfurt, and in 1979 was involved in the establishment of Die Grünen. In the 1980s he was active in Hesse for the party, was a municipal councillor in Frankfurt 1981–1983, and was elected to the Bundestag in 1983, serving until 1985, as a member of its Foreign Affairs Committee. His main interests there were foreign affairs and security, Central and Eastern Europe and human rights. From 1985 to 1990, he was a group specialist on foreign and security policy, human rights and Eastern Europe.

Besides his political work, Horáček engaged in Czechoslovak exile activities. He was publisher of the Czech exile magazine Listy ("Sheets"). In 1990 his Czech citizenship was restored and president Václav Havel appointed him to the Council of Advisers. He was director of the Heinrich Böll Foundation's office in Prague from 1991 to 2004, and also worked at its Bonn office 1998–2000.

As a candidate of the Green Party federations of Saxony, Saxony-Anhalt and Thuringia he was elected to the European Parliament in June 2004. He also participates in activities of Green Party in the Czech Republic and was not reelected to European Parliament in June 2009.

In 2008, he co-organized (with Gisela Kallenbach) a public hearing in the European Parliament on totalitarian regimes in support of the Prague Declaration. He co-sponsored the European Parliament resolution of 2 April 2009 on European conscience and totalitarianism.
