= Václav Vaško =

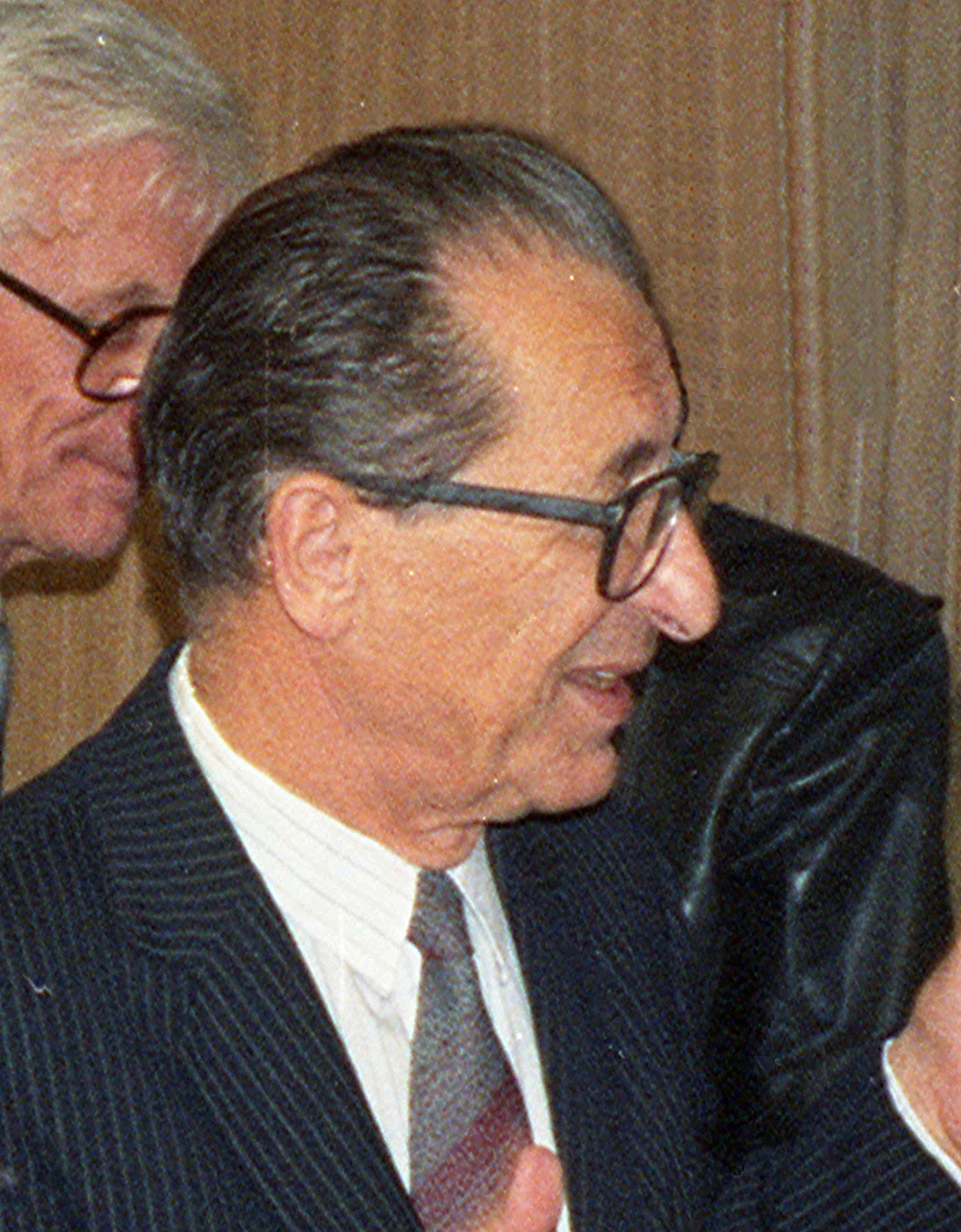
Václav Vaško in 1994

Václav Vaško (26 April 1921 – 20 May 2009) was a Czech diplomat, human rights activist, author of books dealing with the history of the Catholic Church during the Soviet occupation and communist dictatorship, and a former political prisoner of the communist regime.

He was awarded the Medal of Merit by President Václav Havel on 28 October 1998. He was a founding signatory of the Prague Declaration on European Conscience and Communism.

== Works ==
- Neumlčená (a chronicle of the Catholic Church in Czechoslovakia during the communist dictatorship, written in the 1980s, published in 1990 in two volumes)
- Kardinál Tomášek (1994, co-authored with Jan Hartmann, Bohumil Svoboda et al.)
- Ne vším jsem byl rád (1999, 2001)
- Dům na skále
  - Církev zkoušená (2004)
  - Církev bojující (2007)
  - Církev vězněná (2008)
- Likvidace řeckokatolické církve (2007)
