= Neela Winkelmann-Heyrovská =

- Born: 6 August 1969 (age 56); Prague, Czechoslovakia (now Czech Republic)

Neela Winkelmann-Heyrovská (born 6 August 1969 in Prague) is a Czech academic, environmental activist and government official. She was the founder and first managing director of the Platform of European Memory and Conscience, an educational project of the European Union bringing together government institutions and NGOs from countries of Europe and North America active in research, documentation, awareness raising and education about the crimes of totalitarian regimes, in 2011-2018.

She is a granddaughter of the chemist and Nobel laureate Jaroslav Heyrovský, and studied biology at the Charles University in Prague, graduating with a master's degree in 1992. She earned a PhD in molecular biology from the Cornell University Graduate School of Medical Sciences in New York in 1997. She was active in the environmental movement from 1984, and was a member of the Czechoslovak preparatory committee for the 1992 Rio de Janeiro Earth Summit. In the 1990s she was involved with environmental NGOs in India, Malaysia and elsewhere. She later worked as an independent consultant to promote renewable energy, such as wind power, in the Czech Republic. For her contribution to the introduction of a feed-in tariff with a long-term guarantee in the Czech Renewable Energy Act, she received the Czech Solar Prize (2004) and the European Solar Prize (2005) from the international organisation EUROSOLAR, as well as the SolarSuperState Award by the Swiss society Renewables-Now in 2011. In 2005-2008, she was an assistant to member of the Czech Parliament, Senator Martin Mejstřík (indep.), former student leader of the 1989 Velvet revolution. She went on to work for the Institute for the Study of Totalitarian Regimes, a Czech government agency, and became the founder and elected managing director of the Platform of European Memory and Conscience in 2011. In 2017, she received the Masaryk Award, named after the first president of Czechoslovakia, from the Czech and Slovak Association of Canada.

In 2003-2004, she was a member of the Czech Green Party, and was a candidate for that party in the European Parliament election of 2004. In the 2009 European Parliament elections, she was the leading candidate for the Czech alternative green movement "Zelení" (The Greens), without political affiliation. She was a member of the Academic Senate of the Natural Science Faculty of the Charles University in 1990–1992. She is fluent in Czech, German and English and also speaks French and Russian.
