= Prague Declaration =

Political declaration signed in 2008 in the Czech Republic

Prague Declaration on European Conscience and Communism
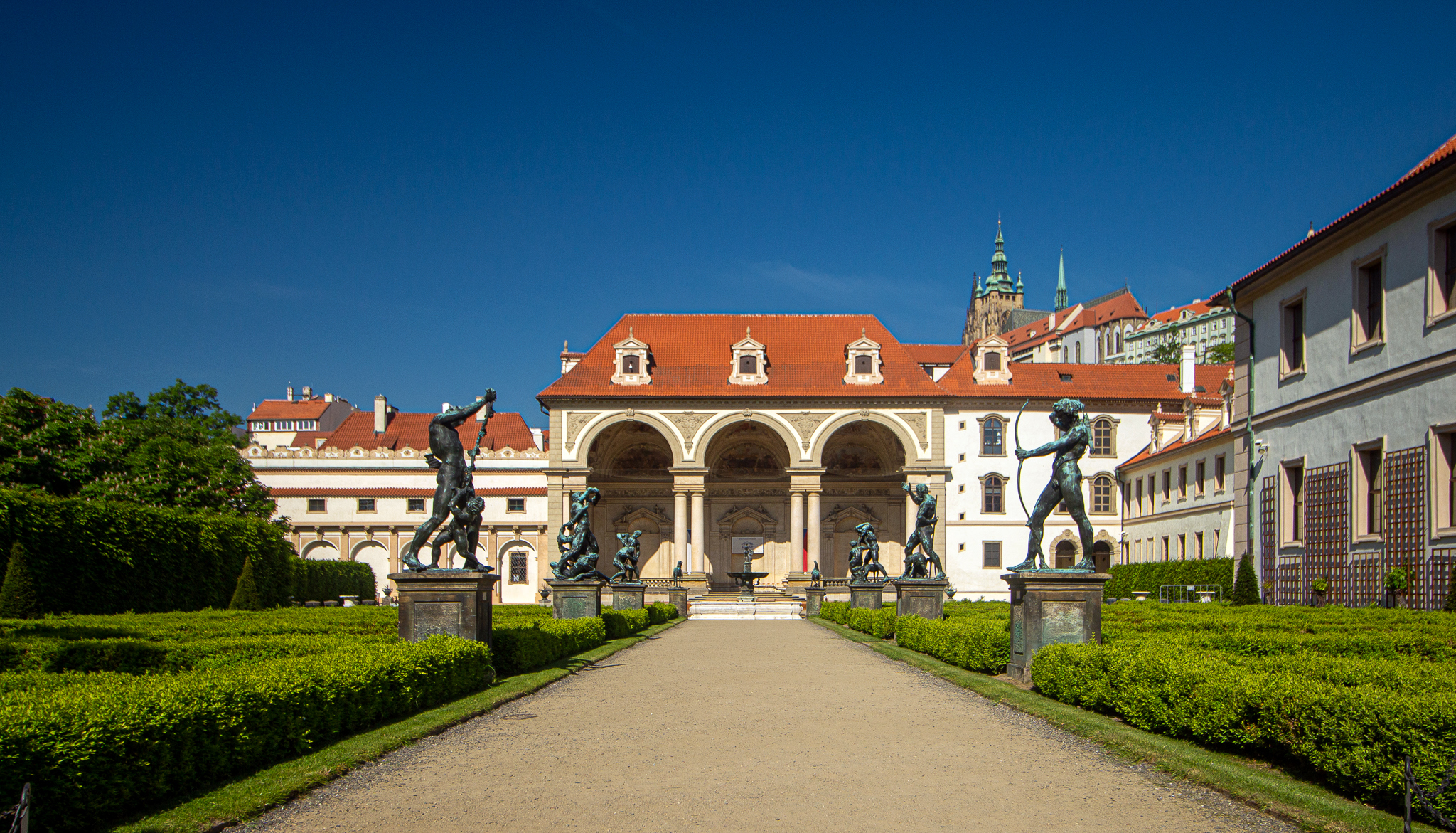
- The Prague Declaration was signed in Wallenstein Palace, seat of the Czech Senate
- Created: 3 June 2008
- Signatories: Václav Havel, Joachim Gauck, Göran Lindblad, Vytautas Landsbergis, Emanuelis Zingeris, Pavel Žáček, Łukasz Kamiński, Martin Mejstřík, Jiří Liška, Ivonka Survilla, around 50 members of the European Parliament, and others
- Purpose: Called for "Europe-wide condemnation of, and education about, the crimes of communism"

The Prague Declaration on European Conscience and Communism was a declaration which was initiated by the Czech government and signed on 3 June 2008 by prominent European politicians, former political prisoners and historians, among them former Czech President Václav Havel and future German President Joachim Gauck, calling for "Europe-wide condemnation of, and education about, the crimes of communism." Much of the content of the declaration reproduced demands formulated by the European People's Party in 2004, and draws heavily on the theory or conception of totalitarianism.

To date, the most visible proposal set forth by the declaration was the adoption of the European Day of Remembrance for Victims of Stalinism and Nazism (known as the International Black Ribbon Day in some countries), adopted by the European Union and the Organization for Security and Co-operation in Europe, as the official international remembrance day for victims of totalitarian regimes. On 14 October 2011, the Platform of European Memory and Conscience, an EU educational project to raise awareness about totalitarian crimes and to combat intolerance, extremism, and anti-democratic movements, was established by the governments of the Visegrád Group and a number of European government institutions and NGOs, as an initiative of the Polish EU presidency and following decisions by the European Parliament and the EU Council supporting the project. The declaration has been cited as an important document in the increasing "criminalisation of Communism" and the strengthening of totalitarian interpretations of Communism in the European political space.

== Conference ==
The declaration concluded the conference European Conscience and Communism, an international conference that took place at the Czech Senate from 2 to 3 June 2008, hosted by the Senate Committee on Education, Science, Culture, Human Rights and Petitions, under the auspices of Alexandr Vondra, Deputy Prime Minister of the Czech Republic for European Affairs, and organised by Jana Hybášková MEP and Senator Martin Mejstřík in co-operation with the Office of the Government of the Czech Republic, the Institute for the Study of Totalitarian Regimes and the European People's Party's Robert Schuman Foundation.

The conference on European Conscience and Communism received letters of support from president Nicolas Sarkozy (France), Lady Margaret Thatcher (UK), Secretary of State Jason Kenney (Canada) and former National Security Advisor Zbigniew Brzezinski (United States).

Laure Neumayer notes that "the conference benefited from the support of a government about to take the presidency of the EU and from the moral authority of former dissidents."

== Declaration ==
The declaration was preceded by the European Public Hearing on Crimes Committed by Totalitarian Regimes. The declaration is part of a wider process at the European and international level, aimed at reaching similar objectives to those stated in the declaration.

Central to the declaration is the call for an "all-European understanding that both the Nazi and Communist totalitarian regimes [...] should be considered to be the main disasters, which blighted the 20th century." The declaration or its proposals have received support from the European Parliament, notably in its 2009 resolution on European conscience and totalitarianism, from other bodies of the European Union, from the governments of multiple European countries affected by communist totalitarian rule and Soviet occupation, and from the Organization for Security and Co-operation in Europe.

The declaration called for:

1. "reaching an all-European understanding that both the Nazi and Communist totalitarian regimes each need to be judged by their own terrible merits to be destructive in their policies of systematically applying extreme forms of terror, suppressing all civic and human liberties, starting aggressive wars and, as an inseparable part of their ideologies, exterminating and deporting whole nations and groups of population; and that as such they should be considered to be the main disasters, which blighted the 20th century"
2. "recognition that many crimes committed in the name of Communism should be assessed as crimes against humanity serving as a warning for future generations, in the same way Nazi crimes were assessed by the Nuremberg Tribunal"
3. "formulation of a common approach regarding crimes of totalitarian regimes, inter alia Communist regimes, and raising a Europe-wide awareness of the Communist crimes to clearly define a common attitude towards the crimes of the Communist regimes"
4. "introduction of legislation that would enable courts of law to judge and sentence perpetrators of Communist crimes and to compensate victims of Communism"
5. "ensuring the principle of equal treatment and non-discrimination of victims of all the totalitarian regimes"
6. "European and international pressure for effective condemnation of the past Communist crimes and for efficient fight against ongoing Communist crimes"
7. "recognition of Communism as an integral and horrific part of Europe's common history"
8. "acceptance of pan-European responsibility for crimes committed by Communism"
9. "establishment of 23 August, the day of signing of the Hitler-Stalin Pact, known as the Molotov–Ribbentrop Pact, as a day of remembrance of the victims of both Nazi and Communist totalitarian regimes, in the same way Europe remembers the victims of the Holocaust on 27 January"
10. "responsible attitudes of National Parliaments as regards acknowledgement of Communist crimes as crimes against humanity, leading to the appropriate legislation, and to the parliamentary monitoring of such legislation"
11. "effective public debate about the commercial and political misuse of Communist symbols"
12. "continuation of the European Commission hearings regarding victims of totalitarian regimes, with a view to the compilation of a Commission communication"
13. "establishment in European states, which had been ruled by totalitarian Communist regimes, of committees composed of independent experts with the task of collecting and assessing information on violations of human rights under totalitarian Communist regime at national level with a view to collaborating closely with a Council of Europe committee of experts"
14. "ensuring a clear international legal framework regarding a free and unrestricted access to the Archives containing the information on the crimes of Communism"
15. "establishment of an Institute of European Memory and Conscience"
16. "organising of an international conference on the crimes committed by totalitarian Communist regimes with the participation of representatives of governments, parliamentarians, academics, experts and NGOs, with the results to be largely publicised world-wide"
17. "adjustment and overhaul of European history textbooks so that children could learn and be warned about Communism and its crimes in the same way as they have been taught to assess the Nazi crimes"
18. "the all-European extensive and thorough debate of Communist history and legacy"
19. "joint commemoration of next year's 20th anniversary of the fall of the Berlin Wall, the massacre in Tiananmen Square and the killings in Romania"

The Declaration cites Council of Europe resolution 1481 as well as "resolutions on Communist crimes adopted by a number of national parliaments." The Declaration was preceded by the European Public Hearing on Crimes Committed by Totalitarian Regimes.

== Signatories ==
The founding signatories included:

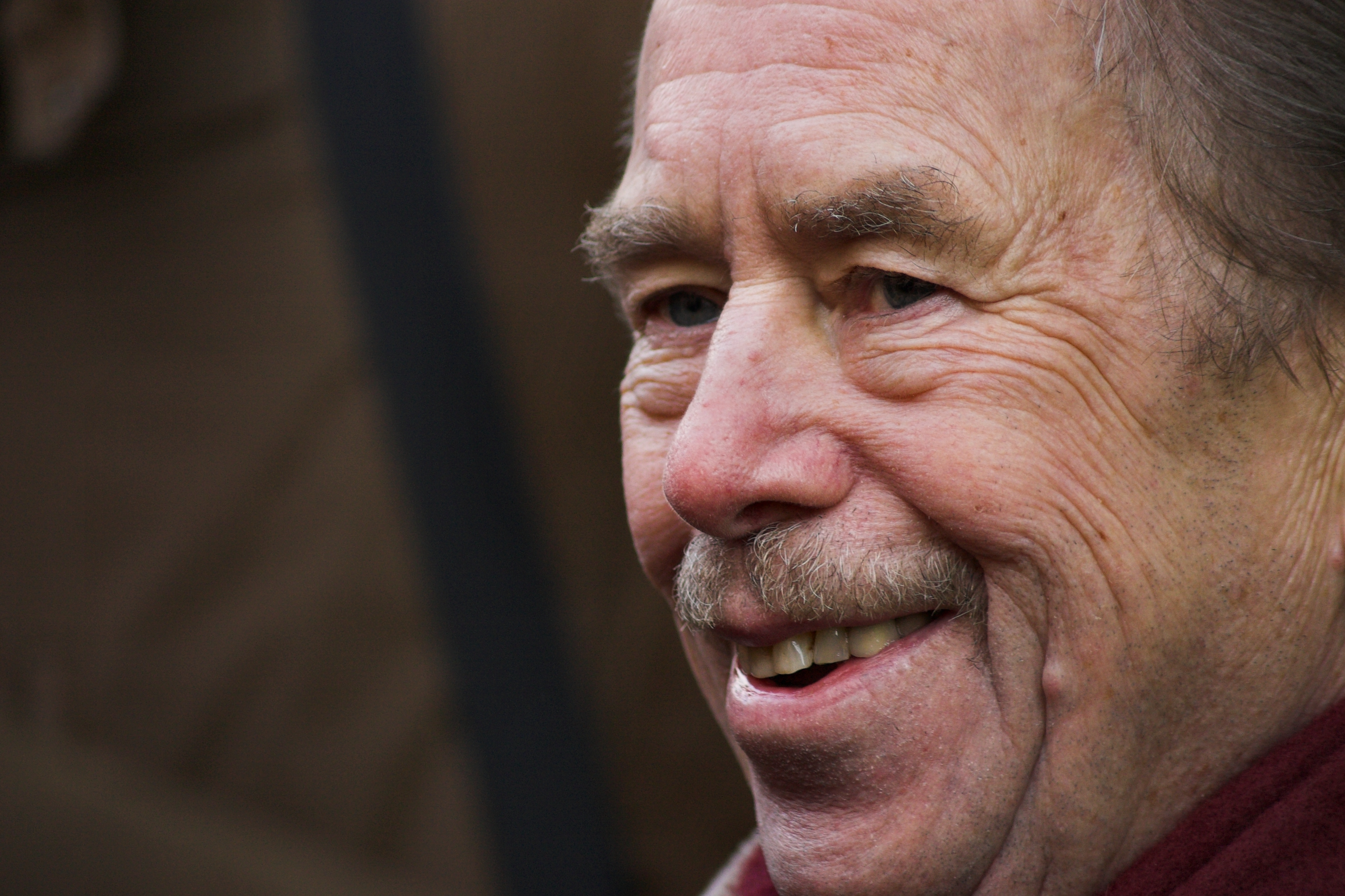
Founding signatory Václav Havel, former President of Czechoslovakia and the Czech Republic, who was also one of the initiators of Charter 77

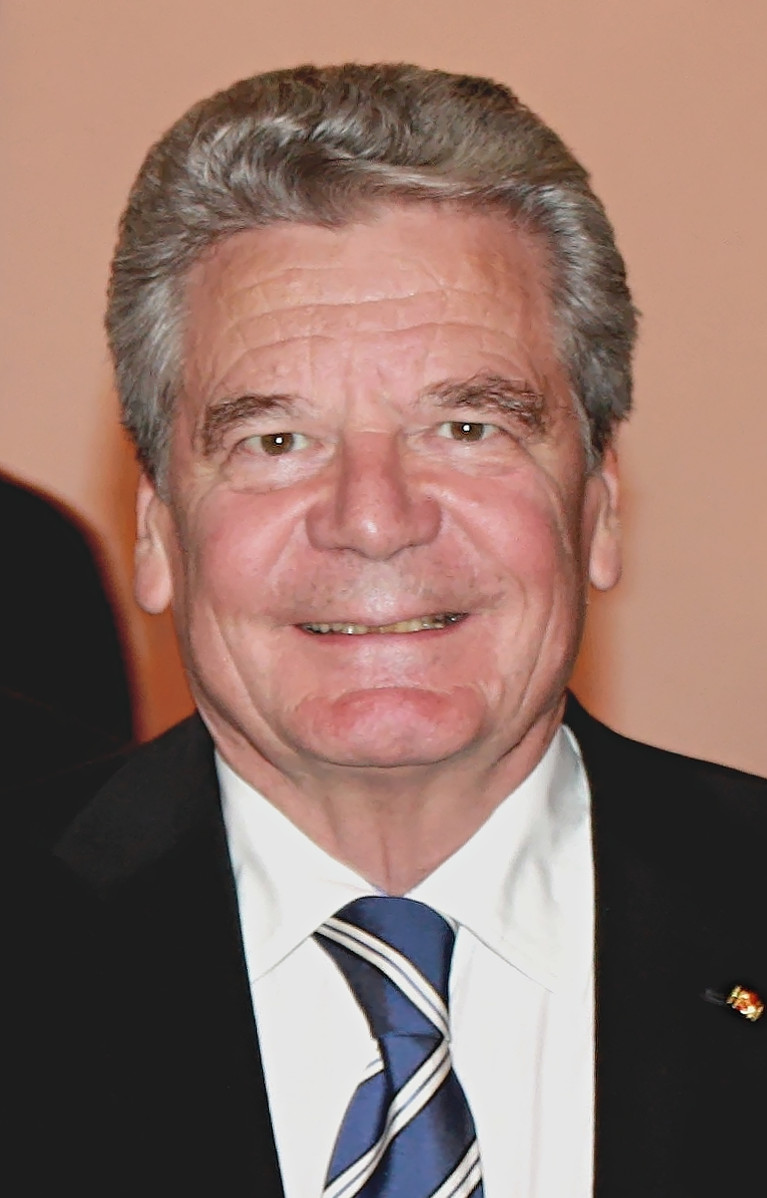
Founding signatory Joachim Gauck

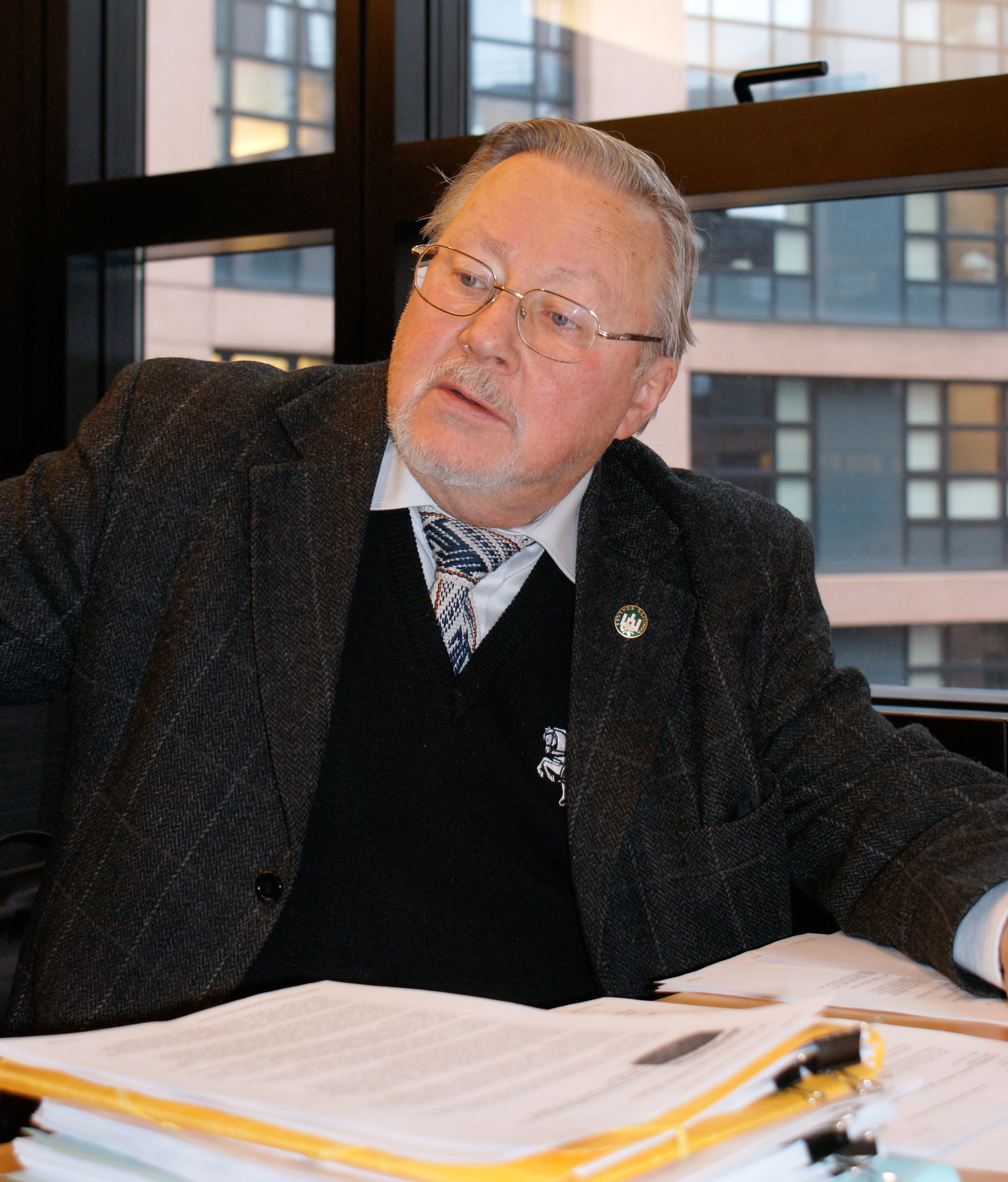
Founding signatory Vytautas Landsbergis, the first head of state of Lithuania after the liberation from Soviet communist occupation

- Václav Havel, former dissident and President of Czechoslovakia and President of the Czech Republic, signatory of Charter 77
- Joachim Gauck, former Federal Commissioner for the Stasi Records and serving President of Germany (2012–17), Germany
- Göran Lindblad, Vice-President of the Parliamentary Assembly of the Council of Europe, Member of Parliament, Sweden
- Vytautas Landsbergis, Member of the European Parliament, former dissident and head of state of Lithuania
- Jana Hybášková, Member of the European Parliament, Czech Republic (since 2011 the Ambassador of the European Union in Iraq)
- Christopher Beazley, Member of the European Parliament, United Kingdom
- Tunne Kelam, Member of the European Parliament, former dissident, Estonia
- Jiří Liška (statesman), Senator, Vice-Chairman of the Senate, Parliament of the Czech Republic
- Martin Mejstřík, Czech Senator
- Jaromír Štětina, Czech Senator
- Emanuelis Zingeris, Member of Parliament, Lithuania, Chairman, International Commission for the Assessment of Crimes of the Nazi and Soviet Occupation Regimes in Lithuania, former honorary chairman of the Lithuanian Jewish Community
- Tseten Samdup Chhoekyapa, Representative of the Dalai Lama for Central and eastern Europe and head of the Geneva Tibet Bureau
- Ivonka Survilla, Leader of the Government-in-exile of Belarus, Canada
- Zyanon Paznyak, Former Chairman of the Belarusian Popular Front, Chairman of the Christian Conservative Party of the Belarusian Popular Front, United States
- Růžena Krásná, former political prisoner, politician, Czech Republic
- Jiří Stránský, former political prisoner, writer, former PEN club chairman, Czech Republic
- Václav Vaško, former political prisoner, diplomat, catholic activist, Czech Republic
- Alexandr Podrabinek, former dissident and political prisoner, journalist, Russian Federation
- Pavel Žáček, Director, Institute for the Study of Totalitarian Regimes, Czech Republic
- Miroslav Lehký, Vice-director, Institute for the Study of Totalitarian Regimes, signatory of Charter 77, Czech Republic
- Łukasz Kamiński, Vice-director, Institute of National Remembrance (IPN), Poland (from 2011 President of the IPN)
- Michael Kißener, professor of history, Johann Gutenberg University, Mainz, Germany
- Eduard Stehlík, historian, Vice-director, Institute for Military History, Czech Republic
- Karel Straka, historian, Institute for Military History, Czech Republic
- Jan Urban, journalist, Czech Republic
- Jaroslav Hutka, former dissident, songwriter, signatory of Charter 77, Czech Republic
- Lukáš Pachta, political scientist and writer, Czech Republic

The Declaration was subsequently also signed by around 50 members of the European Parliament and other politicians from around the world, including Els de Groen, Ģirts Valdis Kristovskis, György Schöpflin, Gisela Kallenbach, Eugenijus Gentvilas, Michael Gahler, Zuzana Roithová, Inese Vaidere, Hans-Josef Fell, Nickolay Mladenov, József Szájer, Peter Stastny, Ari Vatanen, Wojciech Roszkowski, László Tőkés, Charlotte Cederschiöld, László Surján, and Milan Zver.

The Declaration was also signed by Lee Edwards (Chairman of the Victims of Communism Memorial Foundation), Asparoukh Panov (Vice-President of the Liberal International), poet and civil rights activist Natalya Gorbanevskaya, philosopher André Glucksmann, and former Yugoslav dissident Ljubo Sirc.

== Aftermath ==
Following its announcement, a number of political developments have taken place relating to the issues raised in the Prague Declaration. These developments have been referred to as the "Prague Process" by the Reconciliation of European Histories Group, an all-party group in the European Parliament chaired by Sandra Kalniete, and by historian Laure Neumayer.

=== 2008 ===
The European Parliament proclaimed the European Day of Remembrance for Victims of Stalinism and Nazism on 23 September 2008 with the support of 409 MEPs from all political factions and called for its implementation by the member states in its 2009 resolution on European conscience and totalitarianism (adopted 533–44 with 33 abstentions), which also called for the establishment of the Platform of European Memory and Conscience. Co-sponsored by the European People's Party, the Alliance of Liberals and Democrats for Europe, The Greens–European Free Alliance, and the Union for Europe of the Nations, the resolution called for the recognition of "Communism, Nazism and fascism as a shared legacy" and "an honest and thorough debate on all the totalitarian crimes of the past century," reconfirmed "its united stand against all totalitarian rule from whatever ideological background," and condemned "strongly and unequivocally all crimes against humanity and the massive human rights violations committed by all totalitarian and authoritarian regimes."

On 18 September 2008, The Greens–European Free Alliance hosted a public hearing in the European Parliament on "Totalitarian Regimes and the opening of the secret files archives in Central and Eastern Europe," based on the Prague Declaration, and organised by MEPs Milan Horáček and Gisela Kallenbach. The official program stated that: "The Prague Declaration on European Conscience and Communism should be the common basis for the research on and evaluation of communist regimes in all countries in East-Europe."

On 18 September 2008, the Bulgarian Parliament officially endorsed the Prague Declaration.

=== 2009 ===
On 18 March 2009, the Czech Presidency of the Council of the European Union in co-operation with MEPs supporting the Prague Declaration hosted the European Public Hearing on European Conscience and Crimes of Totalitarian Communism: 20 Years After, as "the third step towards the establishment of a European platform of memory and conscience to support the activities of institutions engaged in reconciling with totalitarian regimes in Europe." The conclusions called for "the establishment of the Platform of European Memory and Conscience" and supported the proclamation of the European Day of Remembrance for Victims of Stalinism and Nazism.

Similar proposals to those of the Prague Declaration received support in the European Parliament, which adopted a 2009 resolution on European conscience and totalitarianism.

On 25 April 2009, the European Democrat Students adopted a resolution, stating that "we, the European Democrat Students, support the Prague Declaration to its full extent and take on the integration of the content to our general policy." The organisation stated that "communism as a totalitarian regime [...] can only distinct itself from Fascism and Nazism by a more recent expiry date and the consequent damage over time it was able to cause."

On 28 April 2009, the governments of Lithuania, Latvia and Estonia were thanked by the President of the European Parliament, Hans-Gert Pöttering, for their efforts to better inform western Europe on the totalitarianism of the Soviet Union. Pöttering brought up the classic study on totalitarianism by Hannah Arendt, which developed "the scientific basis criteria to describe totalitarianism," concluding that "both totalitarian systems (Stalinism and Nazism) are comparable and terrible," Pöttering said.

On 16 June 2009, the EU General Affairs Council adopted conclusions stating that, "in order to strengthen European awareness of crimes committed by totalitarian regimes, the memory of Europe's troubled past must be preserved, as reconciliation would be difficult without remembrance."

On 3 July 2009 the Parliamentary Assembly of the Organization for Security and Co-operation in Europe issued the Vilnius Declaration which, among other resolutions on several issues, contained a "Resolution on Divided Europe Reunited: Promoting Human Rights and Civil Liberties in the OSCE Region in the 21st Century" and supported the designation of 23 August as a European Day of Remembrance for Victims of Stalinism and Nazism.

Joseph Daul, chairman of the European People's Party group, stated:

2009 is a deeply symbolic year, since we celebrate both the 60th anniversary of the creation of NATO and the beginnings of the cold war, and the 20th anniversary of the fall of the Berlin Wall, which ended it. This is why we have proposed to launch a Europe-wide day of remembrance which will help Europe reconcile its totalitarian legacy, both from the Nazis and the Communists.

In 2009, the Seimas (Parliament) of Lithuania also endorsed the Prague Declaration, on the initiative of Emanuelis Zingeris.

=== 2010 ===
In the European Parliament, an all-party group of MEPs named Reconciliation of European Histories Group was established. Its objective is to "reconcile the different historical narratives in Europe and to consolidate them into a united European memory of the past." It is chaired by former EU Commissioner Sandra Kalniete. Its members also include Hans-Gert Pöttering, László Tőkés, Heidi Hautala, and Gunnar Hökmark.

On 25 February 2010, the Declaration on Crimes of Communism was adopted, concluding the international conference Crimes of the Communist Regimes, which was organised by the Institute for the Study of Totalitarian Regimes and the Government of the Czech Republic in co-operation with the European Parliament, the European Commission, and the Konrad Adenauer Foundation, under the patronage of Jan Fischer, Prime Minister of the Czech Republic, and Heidi Hautala (Greens), Chair of the Human Rights Subcommittee of the European Parliament, among others. The 2010 declaration reiterated many of the suggestions of the Prague Declaration, stating that "the justice done to perpetrators of Communist crimes over the past 20 years has been extremely unsatisfactory" and calling for "the creation of a new international court with a seat within the EU for the crimes of communism."

The European Union's Stockholm Programme states that:

The Union is an area of shared values, values which are incompatible with crimes against humanity, genocide and war crimes, including crimes committed by totalitarian regimes. Each Member State has its own approach to this issue but, in the interests of reconciliation, the memory of those crimes must be a collective memory, shared and promoted, where possible, by us all.

As the European Union officially observed the European Day of Remembrance for Victims of Stalinism and Nazism in 2010, the Molotov–Ribbentrop Pact was described by the European Parliament's President Jerzy Buzek as "the collusion of the two worst forms of totalitarianism in the history of humanity."

In December 2010, the foreign ministers of six EU member states (Note: Bulgaria, the Czech Republic, Hungary, Latvia, Lithuania, and Romania) called upon the European Commission to make "the approval, denial or belittling of communist crimes" an EU-wide criminal offence. "Alongside the prosecution and punishment of criminals, the denial of every international crime should be treated according to the same standards, to prevent favourable conditions for the rehabilitation and rebirth of totalitarian ideologies," the foreign ministers wrote in a letter to justice commissioner Viviane Reding. Denial of all totalitarian crimes has been outlawed in only four member states: Poland, the Czech Republic, Lithuania and Hungary. Czech Foreign Minister Karel Schwarzenberg argued that the denial of the crimes of communism is analogous to denying the crimes of Nazism, which in many EU countries is a criminal offence, arguing that "there is a fundamental concern here that totalitarian systems be measured by the same standard.". However, a spokesman for justice commissioner Viviane Reding said that "at this stage, the conditions to make a legislative proposal have not been met," citing an independent report the European Commission had commissioned to examine the existing legal framework of member states.

=== 2011 ===
In a report from the European Commission on 12 January 2011, the European Commission stated that: "The Commission is committed to contributing, in line with its responsibilities, to the promotion of the memory of the crimes committed by totalitarian regimes in Europe."

On 29 March 2011, a public hearing on "What do Young Europeans know about Totalitarianisms?" took place in the European Parliament, hosted by the European People's Party under the patronage of the Hungarian Presidency of the European Union, and organised by MEPs Sandra Kalniete, László Tőkés and Milan Zver. The purpose of the hearing was "to focus on the importance to provide objective and comprehensive information about the totalitarian past, as public discourse can lead to a better, deeper understanding of our shared history and a greater feeling of unity." László Tőkés MEP, Vice-President of the European Parliament (EPP), said in his address during the hearing that: "War crimes, genocide and mass murder—irrespective of what kind of totalitarian dictatorship committed them—will remain crimes against humanity, therefore we must stand up against them."

In May 2011, the Czech Senate almost unanimously demanded that the European Commission "should in the future actively seek to create conditions for the punishment of crimes based on class and political hatred in the whole EU."

On 10 June 2011, the EU Justice and Home Affairs Council, that is, the justice and home affairs ministers of all EU Member States, adopted conclusions stating, inter alia, that it reaffirmed "the importance of raising awareness of the crimes committed by totalitarian regimes, of promoting a shared memory of these crimes across the Union and underlining the significant role that this can play in preventing the rehabilitation or rebirth of totalitarian ideologies," and highlighted "the Europe-wide Day of Remembrance of the victims of the totalitarian regimes (23 August)," inviting member states to "consider how to commemorate it."

On 23 August 2011, the Polish Presidency of the European Union organised a conference on the occasion of the European Day of Remembrance for the Victims of Totalitarian Regimes. The EU presidency cited the Justice and Home Affairs Council conclusions of 10 June and the EU's Stockholm Programme, which emphasises that "remembrance of shared history is necessary to understand contemporary Europe." European officials adopted the Warsaw Declaration for the European Day of Remembrance for the Victims of Totalitarian Regimes. The Warsaw Declaration vows that the suffering of victims of totalitarian regimes "will not sink into oblivion." The declaration states that "crimes of totalitarian regimes in Europe should be acknowledged and condemned, regardless of their type and ideology." Justice Minister Krzysztof Kwiatkowski said that the "Warsaw Declaration is a unanimous agreement of all EU member states that we have to do everything we can to prevent any totalitarian regime from reviving in all the countries making up one big European family." Senate Speaker Bogdan Borusewicz said that "the 20th century was the time of two totalitarianisms, ideologically different but functioning in a similar way." The EU called for launching and supporting educational and information initiatives on totalitarian regimes.

On 14 October 2011, the Platform of European Memory and Conscience, an EU educational project to raise awareness about totalitarian crimes and to combat intolerance, extremism, and anti-democratic movements, was established by the governments of the Visegrád Group and a number of European government institutions and NGOs, as an initiative of the Polish EU presidency and following decisions by the European Parliament and the EU Council supporting the project. Bringing together government institutions and organisations from EU countries active in research, documentation, awareness raising and education about the crimes of totalitarian regimes, the platform's member institutions include the Institute for the Study of Totalitarian Regimes, the Institute of National Remembrance, the Berlin-Hohenschönhausen Memorial, the Federal Commissioner for the Stasi Records, and other institutions. As an educational project of the EU, the Platform of European Memory and Conscience will facilitate co-operation among its member institutions and help combat intolerance, extremism, and anti-democratic movements.

On 19 October 2011, the European People's Party group hosted a public hearing in the European Parliament on the memory of the crimes committed by totalitarian regimes in Europe, chaired by Sandra Kalniete and with an introduction speech by Doris Pack, Chair of the Culture and Education Committee.

=== 2012 ===
In February 2012, the sixth Mene Tekel international culture festival against totalitarianism, evil and violence took place in Prague, supported by the Platform of European Memory and Conscience. A 2012 declaration asking the former communist states to pass legislation enabling the just punishment of communist criminals and scrapping all advantages they may still enjoy was passed, and signed by 17 Czech NGOs as well as NGOs from Bulgaria, Estonia, Hungary, Latvia, Lithuania, Poland, Romania and Slovakia.

On 5 June 2012, the Platform of European Memory and Conscience, the European Network Remembrance and Solidarity, and the Reconciliation of European Histories Group hosted the conference Legal Settlement of Communist Crimes in the European Parliament, under the auspices of Hans-Gert Pöttering and Jerzy Buzek, devoted to the issue of forming a special court tribunal for the crimes of communism, and "raising the issue of justice for the most serious crimes committed by the Communist dictatorships in Central and Eastern Europe from the national to a European level." The conference was a response "to growing calls for strengthened international justice formulated e.g., in the Prague Declaration on European Conscience and Communism." Following the conference, the Platform of European Memory and Conscience founded an international legal expert group to "work on a road map for establishing a supranational institution of justice" devoted to the "crimes committed by the Communist dictatorships."

On 23 August 2012, during a ceremony in the House of Terror museum and in the Hungarian Parliament commemorating the European Day of Remembrance for Victims of Totalitarianism in Budapest, opened by the Hungarian President János Áder, and attended by the Ministers or State Secretaries of Justice from several European countries, an agreement on the creation of a European museum of totalitarianism was signed.

=== 2013 ===
On 14–15 May 2013, the EU Platform of European Memory and Conscience, the Polish state Institute of National Remembrance, the Warsaw Uprising Museum and the Czech state Institute for the Study of Totalitarian Regimes hosted the conference "Modern Forms of Commemoration of Totalitarian Genocide Places" in Warsaw.

=== 2019 ===
Referencing the Prague Declaration and other declarations, the European Parliament adopted the resolution "Importance of European remembrance for the future of Europe" in 2019, sponsored by the European People's Party group, the Progressive Alliance of Socialists and Democrats group, the liberal Renew Europe group and the European Conservatives and Reformists group. The resolution stated that "the Nazi and communist regimes carried out mass murders, genocide and deportations and caused a loss of life and freedom in the 20th century on a scale unseen in human history." It condemned Russian state "propaganda [that continues] to whitewash communist crimes and glorify the Soviet totalitarian regime" and condemned "the current Russian leadership [for distorting] historical facts and [whitewashing] crimes committed by the Soviet totalitarian regime", which the resolution described as an "information war waged against democratic Europe." The resolution stressed that there is "an urgent need to raise awareness, carry out moral assessments and conduct legal inquiries into the crimes of Stalinism and other dictatorships", called on "Russian society to come to terms with its tragic past" and highlighted the importance of Black Ribbon Day.

== Discussion ==
Since it was signed in 2008, the Prague Declaration has been opposed by various groups. The Economist states: "It has attracted support in bodies such as the European Parliament. But it has infuriated some, if not all, Jewish activists; left-wing politicians (mostly from western Europe); and inevitably, Russia."

Notably, Russia protested against the Organization for Security and Co-operation in Europe's support for the European Day of Remembrance for Victims of Stalinism and Nazism; its delegation tried but failed to have the resolution withdrawn. Several representatives of the Russia-based organisation World Without Nazism have criticised the Prague Declaration. The organisation's founder and chairman, Boris Spiegel (a Russian politician with close ties to the Kremlin), claimed that the Prague Declaration is supported by "supporters of the Nazis," and accused the countries that were formerly part of the Communist Bloc (except Russia and Belarus) of "rapid Nazification." In response to the Prague Declaration's condemnation of Stalinism, he criticised the role of Western European democracies in starting World War II.

Efraim Zuroff of the Simon Wiesenthal Center has criticised the Prague Declaration repeatedly, describing it as "the main manifesto of the false equivalency movement."

On 20 January 2012, a declaration initiated by Dovid Katz, co-authored by Professor Danny Ben-Moshe of Deakin University, Melbourne, Australia, and signed by 70 parliamentarians, titled the Seventy Years Declaration, was issued, rejecting "attempts to obfuscate the Holocaust by diminishing its uniqueness and deeming it to be equal, similar or equivalent to Communism as suggested by the 2008 Prague Declaration." In response the Minister of Foreign Affairs of Lithuania, Audronius Ažubalis, called the Seventy Years Declaration "deplorable" and "pathetic," and said it echoed "the Kremlin's ideologues" and contradicted the position of the EU. He added that "it is not possible to find differences between Hitler and Stalin except in their moustaches (Hitler's was shorter)." The Prime Minister of Lithuania Andrius Kubilius argued that both Nazi and Soviet crimes are "unique" and the pain suffered is "immeasurable".

The Communist Party of Greece opposes the Prague Declaration and has criticised "the new escalation of the anti-communist hysteria led by the EU council, the European Commission and the political staff of the bourgeois class in the European Parliament." The Communist Party of Britain opined that the Prague Declaration "is a rehash of the persistent attempts by reactionary historians to equate Soviet Communism and Hitlerite Fascism, echoing the old slanders of British authors George Orwell and Robert Conquest."

In June 2008, Shimon Samuels of the Simon Wiesenthal Centre accused signatories Václav Havel and Vytautas Landsbergis of having "anti-Semitic, racist and Holocaust distortionist motives." Lithuanian politician Leonidas Donskis MEP has accused the declaration of equating Soviet and Nazi crimes. On 29 October 2009, the British Labour MP John Mann called the declaration a "sinister document, it uses the smokescreen of legitimate concerns about the evils of Communist regimes to insist that Soviet Communism and Nazi Fascism be declared equal."

Barry Rubin argues that "it is in the interest of Jews and Israelis to support the Prague Declaration which seeks to discuss, expose and recognize Communist crimes of war in the same way Nazi crimes were." Rubin criticises "a tiny group of people" of waging "a relentless campaign" against the declaration, and "[making] Jews the defenders of the Communist totalitarian system that murdered and tortured millions of people, including hundreds of thousands of Jews." Efraim Zuroff responded: "The opposition to the Prague Declaration has never been based on a desire to hide communist crimes, nor do we oppose any initiative to honor and commemorate their victims or punish those guilty of committing those crimes."

Šarūnas Liekis, a Yiddish studies professor from Vilnius, criticised the actions of both sides of the debate, stating that "we are squeezed between two Talibans" and suggesting that "the same obstinacy that plagues Lithuania's relations with Poland lies behind politicians' refusal to reverse their mistakes on Jewish issues."

Soviet and Communist studies scholar Vladimir Tismăneanu argues that the Prague Declaration and the Vilnius Declaration "can be seen as the fulfillment of the second stage of postcommunist development in the region" as "both documents condemn the atrocities of the last century and resolve to proceed on a path of democracy and tolerance."

== See also ==
- Act on Illegality of the Communist Regime and on Resistance Against It
- Declaration on Crimes of Communism
- Communist crimes (legal concept)
- Comparison of Nazism and Stalinism
- Council of Europe resolution 1481
- Denial of the Holodomor
- European Day of Remembrance for Victims of Stalinism and Nazism
- European Parliament resolution of 2 April 2009 on European conscience and totalitarianism
- European Public Hearing on Crimes Committed by Totalitarian Regimes
- Holodomor
- House of Terror
- Institute for Information on the Crimes of Communism
- Mass killings under Communist regimes
- Platform of European Memory and Conscience
- Victims of Communism Memorial Foundation
- Vilnius Declaration
- Culture of Remembrance
