= Asparuh Panov =

Bulgarian politician and physician

Asparuh Panov is a Bulgarian physician and liberal politician. He is a former Member of Parliament and former Vice President of the Liberal International.

He was Project Coordinator of the Friedrich Naumann Foundation for Bulgaria and Macedonia until 2013. Panov belongs to the liberal wing of the Union of Democratic Forces and has been leader of the Radical Democratic Party. He is a signatory of the Prague Declaration on European Conscience and Communism.
