= Jaromír Jermář =

Czech historian & politician (born 1956)

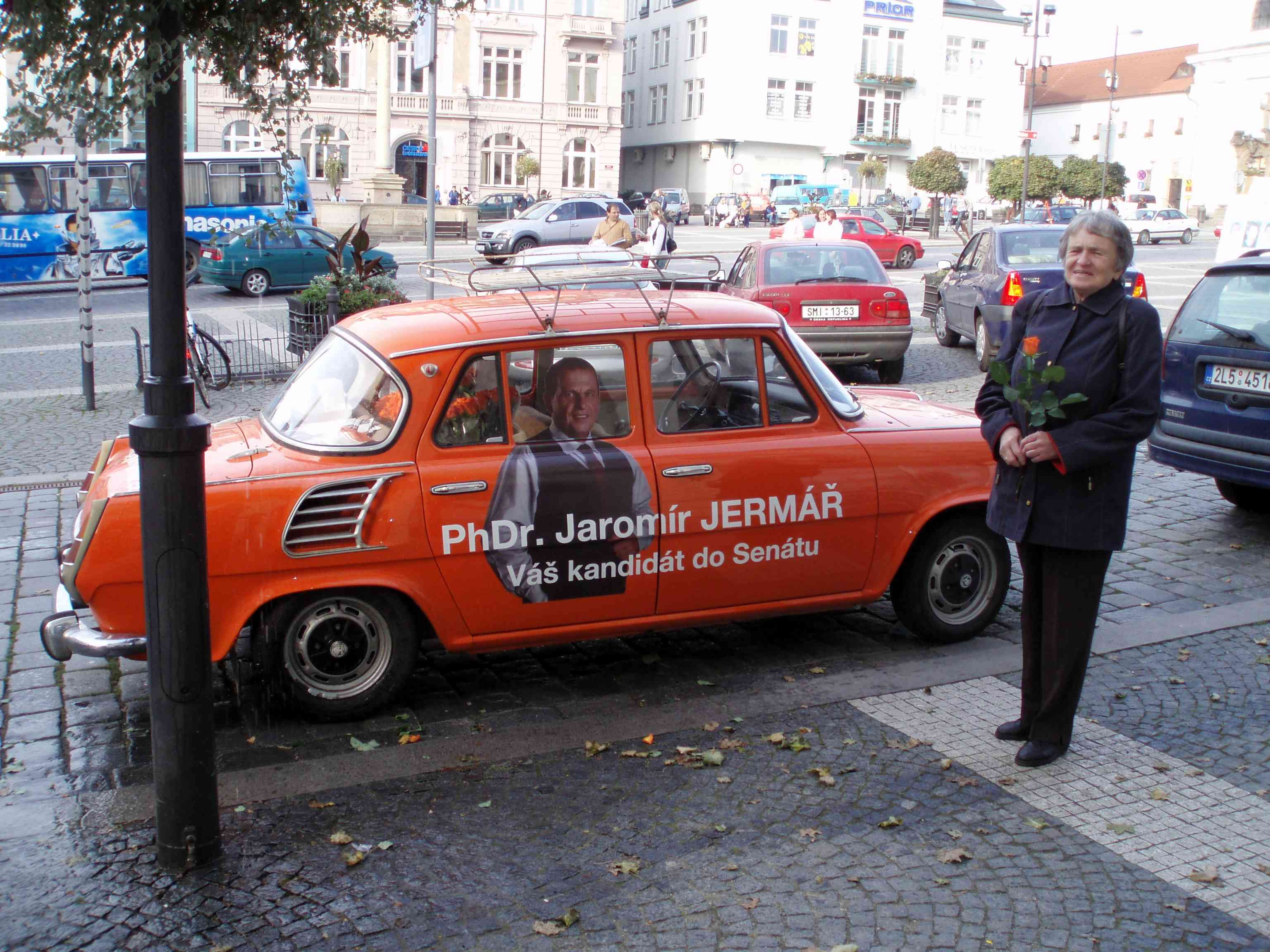

Senator
- In office 28 October 2006 – 20 October 2018
- Preceded by: Jaroslav Mitlener
- Succeeded by: Raduan Nwelati

Personal details
- Born: 2 October 1956 (age 69)
- Party: Czech Social Democratic Party
- Website: jaromir-jermar.cz

Jaromír Jermář (born 2 October 1956, in Prague) is a Czech historian and politician. He served as a Senator in the Senate of the Parliament of the Czech Republic (form 28 October 2006 to 20 October 2018), and was chair of the Senate Committee on Education, Science, Culture, Human Rights and Petitions. He is a member of the Czech Social Democratic Party.

Jermář was a student at Charles University from 1975 to 1980, and earned a doctorate in history in 1983. From 1980, he was employed at the museum in Mladá Boleslav.
