= Michael Kißener =

German historian

Michael Kißener (born 3 December 1960, in Bonn) is a German historian and Professor at the University of Mainz. His research is focused on the history of the national socialist regime (the Third Reich) and the opposition against it.

He earned his doctorate in 1991, and headed the Forschungsstelle Widerstand at the University of Karlsruhe from 1992 to 2002. In 2000, he earned his Habilitation. He was appointed Professor of Contemporary History at the University of Mainz in 2002.

He is a founding signatory of the Prague Declaration on European Conscience and Communism.

== Works ==
- Rheinhessische Wege in den Nationalsozialismus. Worms 2010
- Der Weg in den Nationalsozialismus. Darmstadt 2009
- Germersheim im 20. Jahrhundert. Ubstadt-Weiher 2008
- Das letzte Wort haben die Zeugen: Alfred Delp. Mainz 2007
- Kleine Geschichte des Landes Rheinland-Pfalz. Mainz 2006
- Das Dritte Reich. Darmstadt 2005
