= Gisela Kallenbach =

German politician (born 1944)

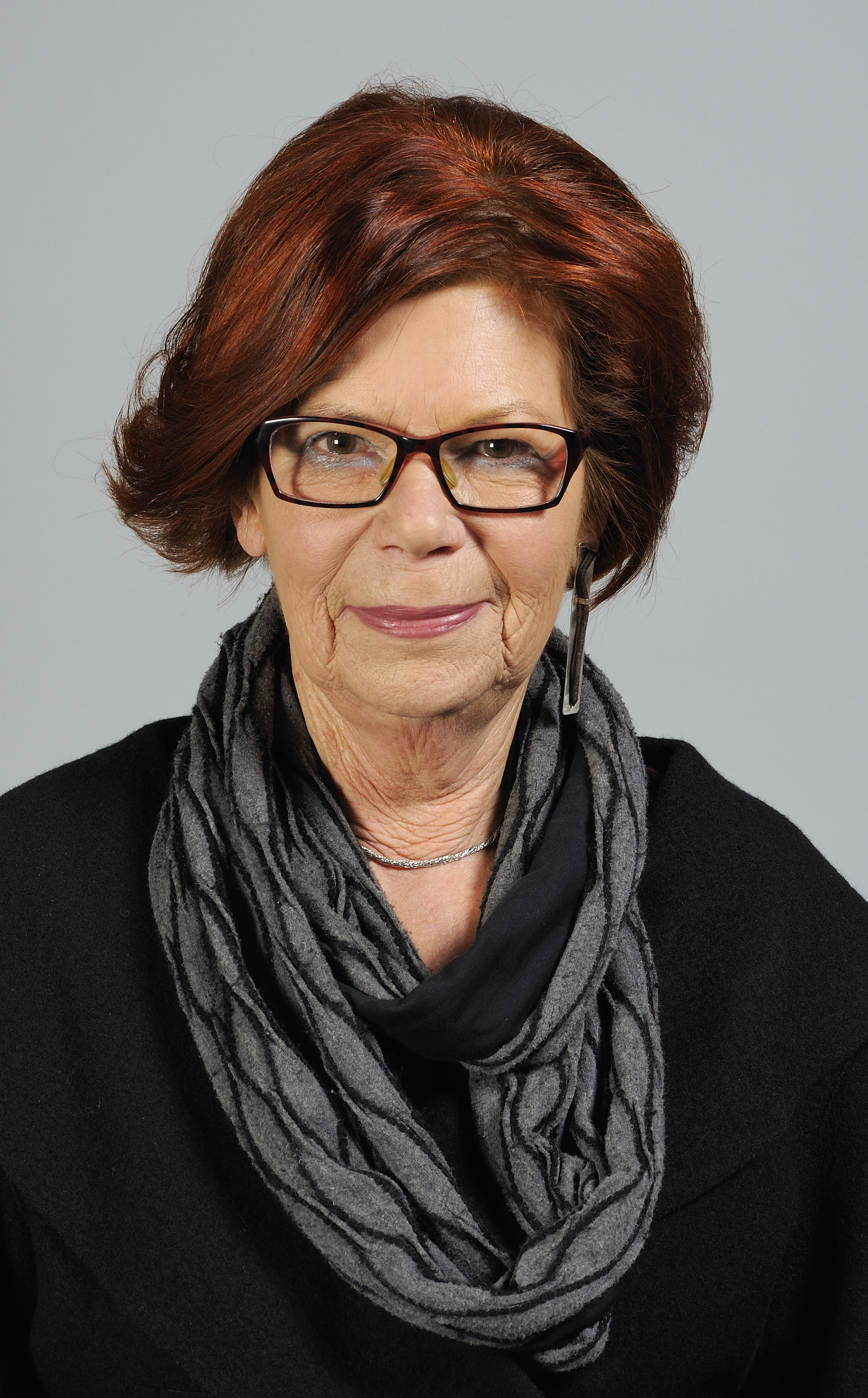
- Gisela Kallenbach (2013)

Member of the European Parliament for Germany
- In office 2004–2009

Member of the Parliament of Saxony
- Incumbent
- Assumed office 2009

Personal details
- Born: 28 March 1944 (age 82) Soldin
- Party: Alliance '90/The Greens, European Greens

Gisela Kallenbach (born 28 March 1944, in Soldin, New March, now Myślibórz, Poland) is a German politician. She served as a Member of the European Parliament for Alliance '90/The Greens, part of the European Greens, from 2004 to 2009. Since 2009, she has been a member of the Parliament of Saxony. From 2000 to 2003, she was the International Mayor of the United Nations Interim Administration Mission in Kosovo. In 2001, she was awarded the Order of Merit of the Federal Republic of Germany.

Due to her family background and Christian faith, she was denied the right to go to Gymnasium and take the Abitur by the East German communist regime. Despite this, she eventually became an engineer and an English translator. From 1990 to 2000, she worked as an adviser for the city of Leipzig's environmental administration. She became involved in local politics with the Greens in 1990.

She is involved with the Zeitzeugenportal, an initiative of the Bundesstiftung zur Aufarbeitung der SED-Diktatur. She is a signatory of the Prague Declaration on European Conscience and Communism, and co-organized (with Milan Horáček) a public hearing in the European Parliament on totalitarian regimes supporting the declaration. Additionally, she support the Freiheit statt Angst demonstrations, which are concerned with citizens' data privacy.
