= Sinikka Antila =

Finnish lawyer and diplomat

Sinikka Aulikki Antila (born 4 November 1960) is a Finnish lawyer and diplomat. She is a leading expert in trade and development at the Ministry of Foreign Affairs Development Policy Department.

Antila was born in Tampere, and started working for the Ministry of Foreign Affairs in 1985.

Between 1988 and 1991, she worked at the International Labor Organization (ILO) in Côte d'Ivoire. At the same time she was in Nigeria as a Manager of the Canadian Fund and as a free-lancer consultant.

From 1998 to 2003, Antila served as Development Co-operation Counselor and Temporary Attorney at the Finnish Embassy in Windhoek from 2001 to 2003. In addition, she has worked in the ministry for development policy positions, and served as Head of General Development Policy and Planning Unit.

Antila was posted from 2007 to 2011 in Lusaka, where she was also a Finnish Ambassador to Zambia, Zimbabwe and Malawi in 2007–2011. After that, she was the Finnish Ambassador to Tanzania in Dar es Salaam from 2011 to 2015. From 2019 to 2023, she was the European Union ambassador to Namibia.
