= Committee on Education, Science, Culture, Human Rights and Petitions =

Committee of the Senate of the Parliament of the Czech Republic

The Committee on Education, Science, Culture, Human Rights and Petitions is a committee of the Senate of the Parliament of the Czech Republic concerned with matters of education, science, culture, human rights and petitions. It consists of nine members. The current chair of the committee is Jaromír Jermář. The vice chairs are Hana Doupovcová, Marcel Chládek, Karel Kapoun, and Jiří Oberfalzer. Its remaining members are Petr Bratský‚ Václav Homolka‚ Miloš Janeček, and Richard Svoboda.

There are two subcommittees: The Subcommittee on Pre-school, Elementary and Secondary Education of the Committee on Education, Science, Culture, Human Rights and Petitions, and the Subcommittee on Sport of the Committee on Education, Science, Culture, Human Rights and Petitions.

In 2008, the committee hosted the international conference European Conscience and Communism.
