= László Tőkés =

Hungarian-Romanian pastor (born 1952)

László Tőkés MEP
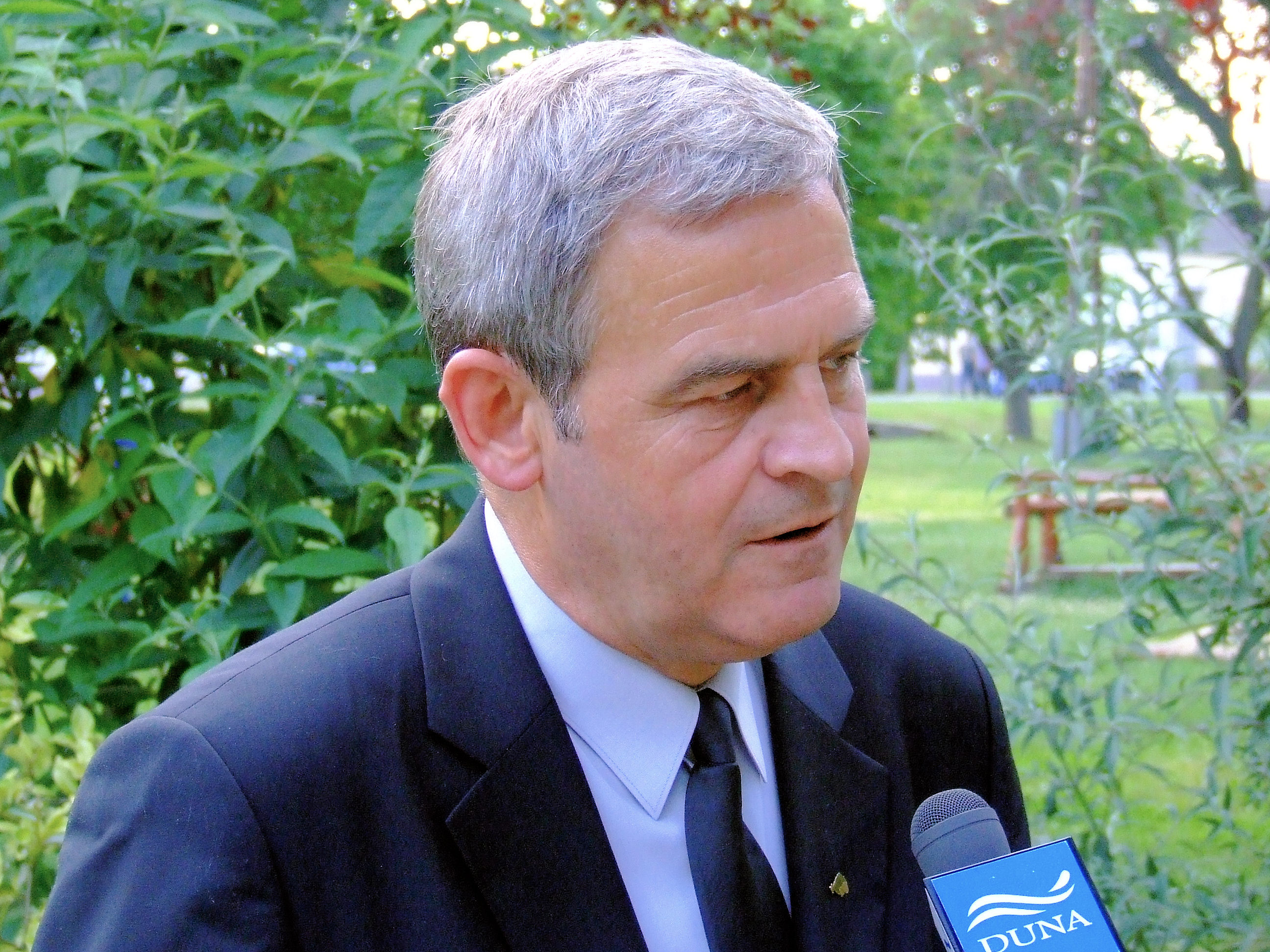
- Tőkés in 2007

Member of the European Parliament
- In office 11 May 2007 – 1 July 2019
- Constituency: Hungary (from 2014); Romania (until 2014)

Personal details
- Born: 1 April 1952 (age 74) Cluj, People's Republic of Romania
- Party: Romanian: Hungarian People's Party of Transylvania, Democratic Alliance of Hungarians in Romania; Hungarian: Fidesz; EU: European People's Party, European Free Alliance
- Spouse: Edit Joó (divorced)
- Children: Máté; Márton; Ilona

László Tőkés (Hungarian pronunciation: [ˈlaːsloː ˈtøːkeːʃ]; born 1 April 1952) is a Romanian pastor and politician of Hungarian descent. He was a Member of the European Parliament (MEP) from 2007 to 2019. Tőkés served as a Vice-President of the European Parliament from 2010 to 2012. Bishop of the Reformed Diocese of Királyhágómellék of the Romanian Reformed Church, he is also a former Honorary President of the Democratic Alliance of Hungarians in Romania. An effort to transfer Tőkés from his position as assistant pastor in Timișoara and evict him from his parsonage helped spark the Romanian Revolution, which overthrew Nicolae Ceaușescu and marked the end of communism in Romania. Tőkés is the president of the Hungarian National Council of Transylvania, a civic organization representing Transylvanian Hungarians. He is closely associated with the Hungarian People's Party of Transylvania (PPMT), but not a member of it. He is a member of the Reconciliation of European Histories Group, and co-sponsored the European Parliament resolution of 2 April 2009 on European conscience and totalitarianism.

== Family ==
A native of Cluj, László Tőkés was the son of István Tőkés, a theology professor and former deputy bishop of the predominantly Hungarian Reformed Church. He was married to Edit Joó, with whom he had three children: sons, Máté and Márton, and daughter, Ilona. Máté Tőkés, who was only three years old during the Revolution of 1989, later gathered memories from friends, relatives, and other participants in the events, and in 2005 published Egymás tükrében (In Each Other’s Mirror), a book about his parents and the family’s hardships.

In March 2010, his wife, Edit Tőkés, filed for divorce. Edit Tőkés accused her husband of 'numerous affairs' and 'unacceptable behavior'. The claims of infidelity and misconduct were confirmed by a former counsellor to the bishop, and the divorce was finalized in February 2011.

== Dissident pastor ==
Like his father, László Tőkés was a persistent critic of Ceaușescu’s totalitarian regime. While serving as a pastor in the Transylvanian town of Dej, he contributed to the clandestine Hungarian-language journal Ellenpontok ("Counterpoints"; 1981–82). An article in the journal on human rights abuses in Romania appears to have triggered his first harassment by the Securitate, Romania’s secret police. He was reassigned to the village of Sânpetru de Câmpie but, refusing to comply, instead spent two years living in his parents’ home in Cluj.

Tőkés’s situation was discussed in the U.S. Senate Committee on Foreign Relations, which indirectly led to his appointment as assistant pastor in Timișoara. There, he delivered sermons opposing the Romanian government’s Systematisation program, which proposed radically restructuring Romanian towns and villages. Small villages were deemed "irrational" and targeted for reduced services, forced population relocation, or physical destruction. This included the destruction of historic churches and monasteries. The program was perceived by Hungarians and human rights activists as particularly threatening to Hungarian villages, although Tőkés’s sermons did not emphasize this, urging solidarity between Hungarians and Romanians. The governments of Hungary and West Germany, concerned about their national minorities in Transylvania, protested against Systematisation.

In the summer of 1988, Tőkés organized opposition to Systematisation among Hungarian Reformed Church pastors, once again attracting the Securitate’s attention. After the Securitate objected to a cultural festival organized on 31 October 1988 (Reformation Day) together with the amateur Hungarian-language theatre group Thalia, Bishop László Papp banned all youth activities in the Banat region, which includes Timișoara. Tőkés nonetheless collaborated with the bishop of the Romanian Orthodox Church on another festival in the spring of 1989.

On 20 March 1989, László Tőkés gave a secretly recorded TV interview to two Canadians, former politician Michel Clair and Radio-Canada journalist Réjean Roy, released as Dracula’s Shadow – The Real Story Behind the Romanian Revolution. The two Canadians were helped by a small group from Székesfehérvár, Hungary, who smuggled video equipment into Romania.

On March 31, 1989, Bishop Papp ordered Tőkés to cease preaching in Timișoara and relocate to the isolated parish in Mineu. Tőkés refused the order, and his congregation stood by him.

On July 24, 1989, Hungarian State TV’s investigative program Panorama broadcast a secretly recorded interview with Tőkés. Two days later, Bishop Papp sent Tőkés a letter accusing him of defaming the state and spreading falsehoods in the interview, and ordered his eviction.

Bishop Papp initiated civil proceedings to evict Tőkés from his parsonage. His electricity was cut off and his ration book was confiscated, but his parishioners continued to support him. The authorities arrested and beat some of his supporters. One of them, Ernő Ujvárossy, was found dead in the woods outside Timișoara on 14 September, and Tőkés’s father was temporarily detained.

In an interview on Hungarian television in July 1989, Tőkés complained that many Romanians were unaware of their human rights. In 2008, Tőkés explained the message and impact of this interview in a German TV series on the collapse of the Iron Curtain:

The message of the interview was that we must not support the Ceaușescu dictatorship. This message was crucial in unmasking Ceaușescu. It had a profound impact on Romanians, including the Securitate, and on the broader population. The program was primarily viewable along the Hungarian-Romanian border, as watching foreign TV channels was prohibited at the time. Those who saw it were deeply shocked, and copies of the interview circulated widely across Romania, particularly in Transylvania, creating an unexpected impact on public sentiment.

On October 20, a court ordered Tőkés’s eviction. He appealed. On November 2, four attackers armed with knives broke into his flat; Securitate agents stood by while he and his friends fought off the assailants. The Hungarian Foreign Ministry summoned the Romanian ambassador to express the government’s concern for Tőkés’s safety. His appeal was rejected, and his eviction was scheduled for Friday, December 15.

Foreign broadcasters also began showing the secretly taped TV interview, such as ABC's Nightline in the U.S.

== December 1989 ==
As December 15 approached, Tőkés’s parishioners began holding a vigil outside his flat, refusing guards’ orders to disperse. On December 15, his parishioners formed a human chain around the building, preventing the militia from entering. Tőkés’s thanked the crowd and advised them to leave, yet several hundred remained in groups outside the flat. His wife, Edit, who was pregnant at the time, fell ill. On December 16, the family doctor arrived to check on Edit. Within half an hour, the mayor of Timișoara arrived with three more doctors, hoping to persuade Edit to seek hospital treatment. On their family doctor’s advice, she refused.

Shortly afterwards, workers arrived to repair the damaged windows and door of the flat; presumably, the mayor hoped to de-escalate tensions, but the crowd grew, with several young Romanians joining Tőkés’s Hungarian parishioners. Tőkés’s spoke with the mayor and again urged the crowd to disperse. The crowd remained; the mayor stormed away, returned by noon, and promised that Tőkés’s eviction would be halted. The crowd remained; some in the crowd accused Tőkés’s of collaborating with the authorities and demanded written confirmation of the cancellation of Tőkés’s transfer and eviction. The mayor promised to provide it within an hour; even if he intended to, it was impossible on a Saturday.

After negotiations with the mayor, deputy mayor, and various delegations, the mayor gave the crowd an ultimatum to disperse by 5 PM or face the fire brigade’s water cannons. Tőkés’s again urged the crowd to disperse, but, believing he was under Securitate threats, they refused. The crowd beckoned him to leave his flat and join them on the street. He refused, presumably fearful of appearing to lead the resistance. 5 PM came and went without the use of water cannons. By 7 PM, the crowd stretched across several blocks and included many students from the local polytechnic and university, Hungarians and Romanians forming a human chain, initially singing hymns but around 7:30 PM launching into the patriotic song Deșteaptă-te, române! (‘Wake Up, Romanian!’), banned in 1947 at the start of the communist dictatorship and sung during the 1987 Brașov rebellion.

In Deletant’s words, "The Hungarian protest had now become a Romanian revolt." The crowd chanted, "Down with Ceaușescu!" "Down with the regime!" and "Down with Communism!" The crowd moved away from Tőkés’s flat and church, crossed a bridge, and headed for the city centre and the Communist Party headquarters, where they threw stones before the militia drove them back toward the church around 10 PM and water cannons were finally deployed. However, the crowd seized the water cannons, dismantled them, and threw the parts into the Bega. A wave of widespread unrest ensued.

Protests continued over the next two days. On Sunday, 17 December, the military fired on the crowd. The number of casualties remains a matter of dispute; early reports were likely exaggerated. The death toll was 73 for the period 16–22 December 1989, and another 20 following Ceaușescu’s flight. At Elena Ceaușescu’s orders, 40 of the dead were transported by lorry to Bucharest and cremated to prevent identification.

On 18 December, tens of thousands of industrial workers in Timișoara peacefully joined the protests; by 20 December, the city had effectively entered a state of insurrection.

News about the protests and the brutal government crackdown spread quickly across Romania, sparking numerous additional protests. These protests rapidly escalated into the Romanian Revolution of 1989, which overthrew Ceaușescu and the Communist regime.

== Bishop of Oradea ==
After the removal of the discredited Communist bishop of Oradea, László Papp, in 1989, László Tőkés was elected bishop of the Reformed Diocese of Királyhágómellék. He was re-elected in 2004 for another six-year term. During his tenure, he worked diligently to reorganize the fragmented church and promote the revival of spiritual life. He emphasised the importance of Hungarian-language education, social responsibility, and missionary work. His top priority was to reclaim the church’s properties and schools confiscated by the Communist regime, but property restitution in Romania proved to be an extremely difficult, slow, and so-far unsuccessful process.

Despite financial difficulties, he founded new social and educational institutions to replace those confiscated. The Christian University of Partium in Oradea was one of his favourite projects, being the first Hungarian-language private university in Romania, which opened in 1999. His other notable initiatives were the childcare centre in Oradea, an orphanage in Aleșd, the Bethesda Healthcare Centre in Arduzel, the Péter Reformed Elementary School in Salonta, and a nursing home in Tinca. The Lórántffy Zsuzsanna Ecclesiastical Centre of the Hungarian Reformed Church, featuring a museum and auditorium, was inaugurated in 1996.

== Political career ==
In 2007, László Tőkés ran for the European Parliament as an independent, with the support of Hungary’s Fidesz. In Romania’s November 2007 election, he secured a seat with sufficient votes. Competing against the Democratic Alliance of Hungarians in Romania, the country’s main Hungarian party, Tőkés was accused by György Frunda, a leading politician of the party, of splitting the Hungarian vote. Frunda also claimed that Tőkés received support from President Traian Băsescu and noted that he garnered 18,000 votes from Romania’s Wallachia and Moldavia regions, where few Hungarians reside. On election night, Tőkés declared, 'I knocked out the Greater Romania Party,' noting that while he won a seat, the far-right, anti-Hungarian Greater Romania Party lost all five of its seats.

In the 2009 European Parliament election he headed the party list of the Democratic Alliance of Hungarians in Romania and was re-elected. In May 2010, he became one of the fourteen vice-presidents of the European Parliament. He was elected by 334 votes in favour and 287 abstentions, replacing Pál Schmitt.

He is a signatory of the Prague Declaration on European Conscience and Communism.

In 2014, he was third on Fidesz’s candidate list for Hungary’s European Parliament election. Before his term ended in 2019, he announced he would not seek re-election, citing the European People’s Party’s (EPP) 'abandonment of Christian Europe'.

=== European elections ===
Election	Votes	Percentage	MEPs	Position	Political group
2007	176,533	3.44%	1 / 35	8th	EFA

== Awards and honours ==
In 1990 he received the Four Freedoms Award for the Freedom of Worship.

In June 2009, in Washington, D.C., he was awarded the Truman-Reagan Medal of Freedom for his role in the struggles against Romanian communism.

He received the Order of the Star of Romania from President Traian Băsescu in 2009. In 2016, President Klaus Iohannis announced that he had decided to withdraw the honor from László Tőkés. 'This matter came to my attention, and I had to make a decision', Iohannis said at Cotroceni Palace. 'In my view, certain factors must be considered when evaluating such cases. Those who grant a distinction aim to honor the recipient, while those who receive it must recognize Romania’s Constitution and appreciate the values that form its foundation. Based on these considerations, I have decided to withdraw the Order of the Star of Romania from László Tőkés'.

Tőkés claimed that the reason for the withdrawal of his award—a 2013 comment to Hungarian Prime Minister Viktor Orbán allegedly proposing a 'protectorate status' for Transylvania, akin to South Tyrol’s status under the Gruber–De Gasperi Agreement—had been mistranslated. By 2016, all Romanian judicial institutions had rejected his appeals, but Tőkés stated he would challenge the decision before the High Court of Cassation and Justice and the European Court of Human Rights.
