= Andreas Schulze (political consultant) =

Andreas Schulze (born 1964) is a German political consultant for the Alliance 90/The Greens, and the designated Press Secretary of the President of Germany, Joachim Gauck.

He has previously served as head of communications for the Alliance 90/The Greens in the Bundestag and as spokesman for Federal Minister of Agriculture Renate Künast from 2001 to 2005 as well as during her campaign to be elected Governing Mayor of Berlin in 2011. He worked for the Federal Commissioner for the Stasi Records from 2006 to 2010, when Marianne Birthler was commissioner.

Schulze proposed Joachim Gauck as a presidential candidate in an SMS to Renate Künast in 2010; Gauck was subsequently nominated by the Greens and the SPD, and Schulze was appointed as spokesman for Gauck during his 2010 candidacy for the Greens and the SPD. The two parties nominated him again in 2012, this time with the support also from the CDU/CSU and the FDP, and Schulze was appointed as Gauck's spokesman during his presidential candidacy. He has been described by Bild and by B.Z. as the "Gauck maker," and by the Frankfurter Allgemeine Zeitung as "the inventor of the designated President." He is expected to be appointed presidential press secretary, a position held until 22 December 2011 by Olaf Glaeseker.
