= 2010 German presidential election =

- 30 June 2010
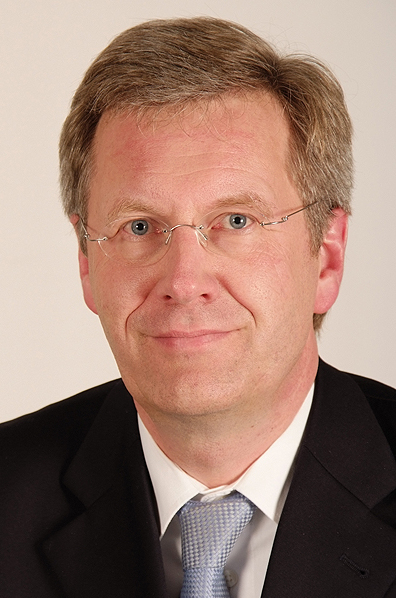

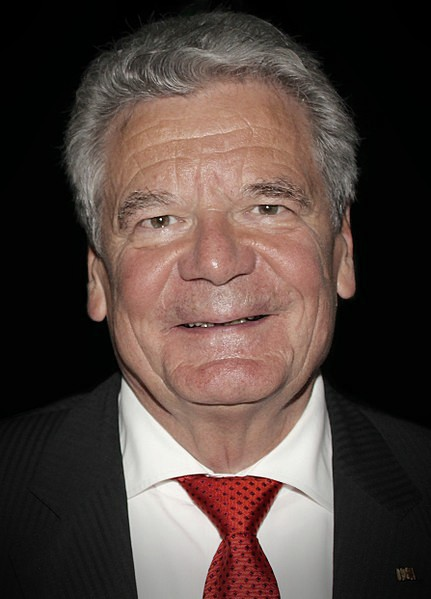
Nominee	Christian Wulff	Joachim Gauck
Party	CDU	Independent
Electoral vote	600 (1st round); 615 (2nd round); 625 (3rd round)	499 (1st round); 490 (2nd round); 494 (3rd round)
Percentage	50.2%	39.7%
Nominators	CDU/CSU, FDP	SPD, Grüne, SSW
President before election
Jens Böhrnsen (Acting)
SPD
Elected President
Christian Wulff
CDU

An indirect presidential election (officially the 14th Federal Convention) was held in Germany on 30 June 2010 following the resignation of Horst Köhler as president of Germany on 31 May 2010. Christian Wulff, the candidate nominated by the three governing parties, the Christian Democratic Union, the Christian Social Union of Bavaria and the Free Democratic Party, was elected president in the third ballot. His main contender was the candidate of two opposition parties, the Social Democratic Party and the Alliance '90/The Greens, independent human rights activist Joachim Gauck.

== Candidates ==
=== Christian Wulff (CDU, CSU, FDP and Free Voters) ===
On 3 June 2010, Christian Wulff (CDU), the incumbent Premier of Lower Saxony, was nominated as the candidate of the government parties (CDU, CSU, FDP). Prior to this, Federal Minister of Labour Ursula von der Leyen (CDU) had been considered the front-runner for the nomination of the government parties.

Because the Constitution of Germany forbids the president to hold other offices, Christian Wulff resigned from his seat in the Landtag of Lower Saxony and left the supervisory board of Volkswagen. He resigned from his post as Premier of Lower Saxony upon being elected as president on 30 June, handing his resignation letter to the president of the Landtag, who was also a delegate to the Federal Convention, before heading towards the podium to formally accept his election.

=== Joachim Gauck (SPD, Greens and SSW) ===
On 3 June 2010, the Social Democratic Party, the Greens and the SSW, nominated independent Joachim Gauck, an anti-communist civil rights activist from East Germany and the first Federal Commissioner for the Stasi Records, as their presidential candidate.

In the days following the official nominations, several FDP and CDU politicians expressed their support for Gauck, among them former Brandenburg CDU chairman Jörg Schönbohm and Oliver Möllenstädt, chairman of Bremen's FDP. Gauck is viewed as a liberal conservative, enjoying respect across political parties. Also Bavaria's Free Voters, who send 10 delegates to the Federal Convention, said they would not nominate a candidate of their own, expressing sympathy for Gauck.

Philipp Freiherr von Brandenstein (CSU) argued that the election of Joachim Gauck would prevent any cooperation between SPD, Greens and the Left Party for years to come: "Gauck has likely made it perfectly clear to Gabriel that he will never appoint any of the apologists of the communist tyranny as government members".

While the Left's co-chairman, Klaus Ernst, initially indicated that his party might support Gauck in a possible second or third ballot, Gregor Gysi, chairman of the Left's parliamentary group in the Bundestag and Oskar Lafontaine, former co-chairman of the party, voiced their opposition to voting for Gauck, criticizing his support of the War in Afghanistan and the Hartz welfare reforms. Katja Kipping, a member of parliament for the Left Party, claimed Gauck was a "man of the past". Kipping lauded Gauck's role in investigating Stasi injustice but criticized "equating Hitler-fascism and the GDR", which she perceives as a "trivialisation of fascism". Klaus Ernst subsequently retracted his statements, stating that the Left will not vote for Gauck. Gauck himself warned the SPD and Greens against cooperating with the Left. Sigmar Gabriel, the SPD chairman, described Lafontaine's reaction as "bizarre and embarrassing", stating that he was "shocked" the party would declare Joachim Gauck their main enemy due to his investigation of communist injustice. Gabriel also said that the "reform forces" in the Left Party should stop "backing down" and "start enforcing their views".

=== Luc Jochimsen (The Left) ===
The left-wing party The Left nominated Luc Jochimsen, a member of parliament and former editor-in-chief of public broadcaster Hessischer Rundfunk. After her nomination, Jochimsen opined that the German Democratic Republic was not a "state of injustice", despite "committing inexcusable injustice towards its citizens". She withdrew after the second ballot, and urged her party members to abstain in the third ballot.

=== Frank Rennicke (NPD) ===
The far-right NPD nominated nationalist singer-songwriter Frank Rennicke. He withdrew after the second ballot.

== Electoral assembly ==
Party	Seats
Christian Democratic Union/Christian Social Union of Bavaria	496
Social Democratic Party	333
Free Democratic Party	148
Alliance '90/The Greens	129
The Left	124
Free Voters	10
National Democratic Party	3
South Schleswig Voter Federation	1
	1,244
Source: wahlrecht.de

Delegates do not only include politicians as delegates, but also celebrities, among them Olympic champion Georg Hettich. The Greens sent Hildegard Hamm-Brücher, the FDP's candidate in the 1994 presidential election, as one of their delegates.

== Results ==
After the first two ballots, Christian Wulff led vote totals but could not win an absolute majority of 623 votes. It was notable that 45 delegates belonging to the governing coalition either voted for Gauck or abstained altogether during the first round. Thus, the vote went to a decisive third round, where only a plurality of votes was required to win. The election is the third to require three ballots since the current system was introduced in 1949.

Candidate	Nominating party/ies	Round one		Round two		Round three	
Candidate	Nominating party/ies	Votes	Percentage	Votes	Percentage	Votes	Percentage
Christian Wulff	CDU, CSU, FDP	600	48.3	615	49.7	625	50.2
Joachim Gauck	SPD, Grüne	499	40.2	490	39.6	494	39.7
Luc Jochimsen	Linke	126	10.1	123	9.6	Withdrawn	
Frank Rennicke	NPD	3	0.2	3	0.2	Withdrawn	
Abstentions		13	1.0	7	0.6	121	9.7
Valid votes		1241	99.8	1238	99.5	1240	99.7
Turnout		1242	99.8	1239	99.6	1242	99.8

== Aftermath ==
A day after the election, a statement by Left Party politician Diether Dehm comparing the choice between Wulff and Gauck to a choice between Adolf Hitler and Joseph Stalin sparked controversy and drew criticism from Greens politician Renate Künast. Dehm subsequently apologized for his choice of words. Künast also stated that any future cooperation with the Left was "miles away", particularly in light of the party's rejection of Gauck. The SPD and Greens also blamed The Left for the election of Christian Wulff. Gysi, on the other hand, criticized the SPD of not cooperating with his party, which is considered extreme by federal authorities, and again pointed out differences in political positions between Gauck and the Left.

On 2 July 2010 Wulff was sworn into office as president of Germany.

Wulff resigned in February 2012 in the midst of political and financial scandals, and Gauck ended up elected as his successor, having won the support of the CDU, CSU and FDP in the snap presidential election.
