= Luc Jochimsen =

German politician (born 1936)

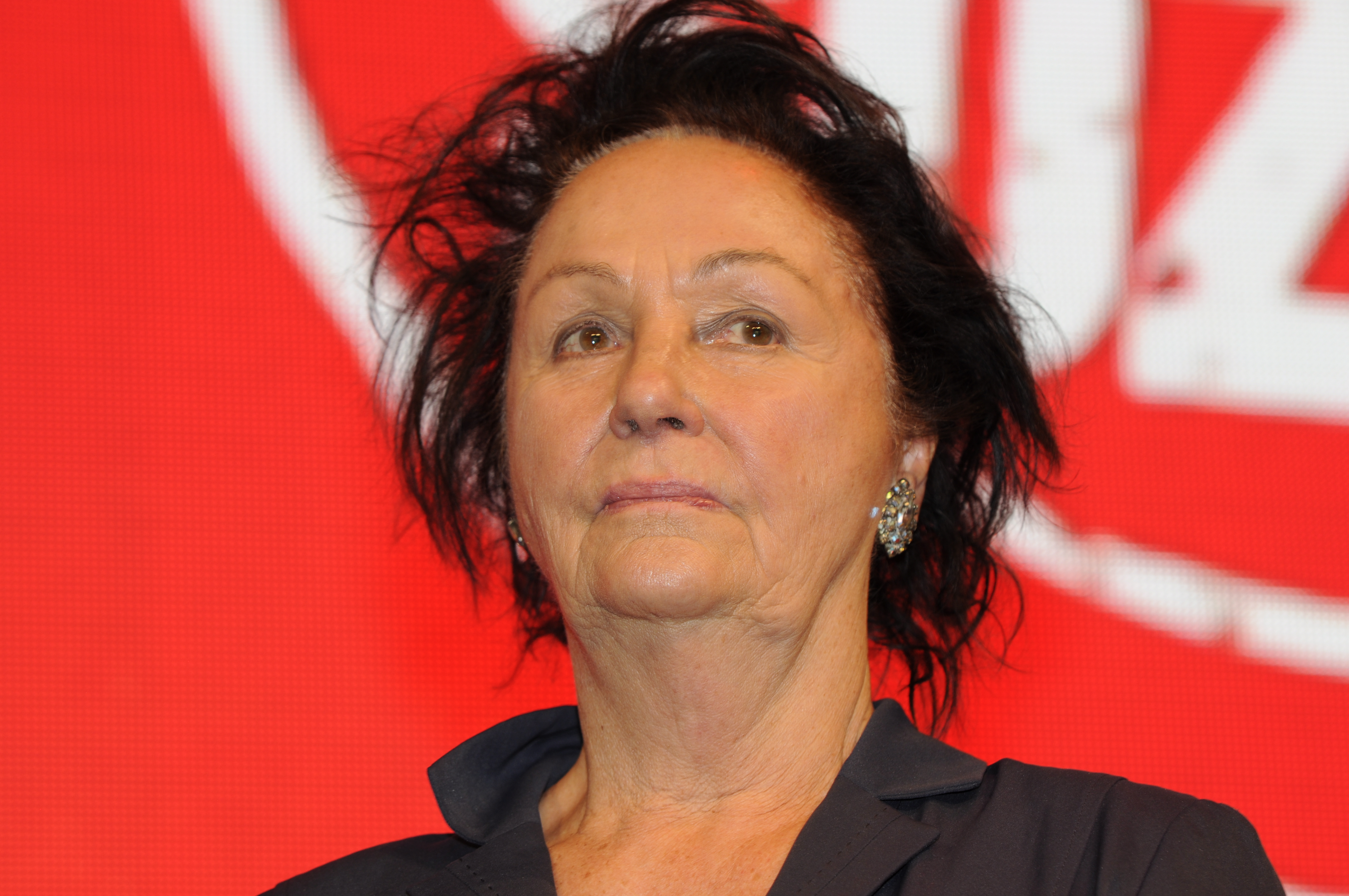
- Jochimsen in 2013

Personal details
- Born: 1 March 1936 (age 90) Nuremberg, Bavaria, Germany
- Party: The Left party
- Occupation: Television journalist and politician

Lukrezia Luise "Luc" Jochimsen (née Lukrezia Schleussinger; born 1 March 1936), is a German former television journalist and politician of The Left party.

== Professional career ==
Jochimsen was born in Nuremberg, the daughter of a vehicle dealer. Her schooling in Frankfurt am Main ended in 1956. She studied sociology, political science, and philosophy at the University of Hamburg. In 1961, she obtained a doctor of philosophy at the University of Münster.

Jochimsen worked as a freelance author from 1961 to 1975. From 1975 to 1985 she was the presenter of the TV programme Panorama in Hamburg. From 1985 to 1988, she was the ARD London correspondent. From 1988 to 1991, she was responsible for the department of documentaries of NDR and from 1991 until 1993 she led the ARD television studios in London. From 1994 to 2001 Jochimsen was the editor-in-chief for the public broadcaster Hessischer Rundfunk, where she chaired the politics show 3 zwei eins.

In 2003 Jochimsen held the Theodor Herzl lectureship at the Institute for Media Studies and Journalism at the University of Vienna.

== Political activities ==
Jochimsen only became politically active in 2002, after her retirement from her television career. She has complained that the former German Democratic Republic (also known as East Germany) and the successor of the Socialist Unity Party of Germany, then named Party of Democratic Socialism (PDS), was being "stigmatized" after the fall of the communist regime in 1989.

In the 2002 Bundestag election, Jochimsen was the top candidate of the Party for Democratic Socialism in Hesse. However, she was not elected. In 2005, she was nominated by the Party for Democratic Socialism in Thuringia in the former East Germany, and was elected. There, she proposed to abolish 3 October (the date of the reunification of Germany) as the national holiday, and instead introduce 8 May, as a national holiday commemorating German defeat in World War II. In September 2009, she was denied access to the Ministry of Defence by the military police on the occasion of the dedication of a monument to German soldiers who were killed in action on missions abroad.

Jochimsen was nominated by her party for President of Germany in the 2010 German presidential election. She opposed Christian Wulff, the candidate of the governing Christian Democratic Union, Christian Social Union of Bavaria and Free Democratic Party, as well as Joachim Gauck, the candidate of the Social Democratic Party of Germany and the Greens, and the candidate of the National Democratic Party of Germany, Frank Rennicke. Following her nomination, Jochimsen opined that the German Democratic Republic was "not a state of injustice per definition", despite "committing inexcusable injustice towards its citizens".

Like the other members of the Bundestag parliamentary group of the Left Party, she is under surveillance by the Federal Office for the Protection of the Constitution.

== Awards ==
Before she started her political activities, she received several professional awards for her work as a journalist.

- 1971: Adolf Grimme Award
- 1981: Alexander Zinn Award
- 1984: Prix Italia
- 2000: Hedwig Dohm Certificate
- 2001: Hessian Order of Merit
