= Andreas Schulz =

Andreas Schulz may refer to:

- Andreas Schulz (rower)
- Andreas Schulz (co-driver)

== See also ==
- Andreas Schulze (disambiguation)
