= List of international presidential trips made by Christian Wulff =

This is a list of presidential visits to foreign countries made by Christian Wulff as President of Germany. Wulff held the office from his election on 2 July 2010 until his resignation on 17 February 2012.

Date	Country	Places visited	Purpose
7–8 July 2010	France; Belgium	Strasbourg; Paris; Brussels	Inaugural visits to France, Belgium, and the institutions of European Union and NATO: Wulff was formally received by French President Nicolas Sarkozy at the Élysée Palace and met with President of the European Parliament Jerzy Buzek, President of the European Commission José Manuel Barroso, President of the European Council Herman Van Rompuy, Secretary General of NATO Anders Fogh Rasmussen as well as Yves Leterme, the Prime Minister of Belgium and President of the European Council.
10–11 July 2010	South Africa	Port Elizabeth; Johannesburg	Wulff met with President Jacob Zuma and watched the third-place play-off of 2010 FIFA World Cup, which was contested between the national teams of Uruguay and Germany, as well as the final between the Netherlands and Spain.
13–14 July 2010	Poland; Austria; Italy	Warsaw; Vienna; Rome	Inaugural visits to Bronisław Komorowski, Heinz Fischer and Giorgio Napolitano, the Presidents of Poland, Austria and Italy, respectively. Wulff also met with Prime Ministers Donald Tusk (of Poland) and Silvio Berlusconi (of Italy).
28 September 2010	Estonia	Tallinn	Inaugural visit to President Toomas Hendrik Ilves, which also included a talk with Prime Minister Andrus Ansip.
11–15 October 2010	Russia	Moscow; Tver; Saint Petersburg; Ulyanovsk	During his first state visit, Christian Wulff met with President Dmitry Medvedev and Prime Minister Vladimir Putin and held a speech about the relationship between Germany and Russia at the Higher School of Economics.
18–22 October 2010	Turkey	Ankara; Kayseri; Tarsus; Istanbul	After having been formally received by President Abdullah Gül and a meeting with Prime Minister Recep Tayyip Erdoğan, Wulff addressed the Grand National Assembly of Turkey, being the first German head of state to be granted this honour. He attended a church service at Tarsus with members of five Christian denominations as well as the groundbreaking ceremony for the Türk-Alman Üniversitesi, a Turkish-German university in Istanbul.
12 November 2010	Luxembourg	Luxembourg	Inaugural visit to Grand Duke Henri; Wulff also met with Prime Minister Jean-Claude Juncker.
18 November 2010	Netherlands	The Hague	Inaugural visit to Queen Beatrix; Wulff also met with Prime Minister Mark Rutte.
22 November 2010	Czech Republic	Prague	Completing a series of inaugural visits, Wulff was received by President Václav Klaus and met with Prime Minister Petr Nečas.
27–30 November 2010	Israel; West Bank	Jerusalem; Beit Jala; Bethlehem	Wulff was received by President Shimon Peres and had talks with Prime Minister Benjamin Netanyahu, Foreign Minister Avigdor Lieberman and opposition leader Tzipi Livni, as well as Palestinian politician Mahmoud Abbas. He visited the Yad Vashem holocaust memorial and the Church of the Nativity.
7 December 2010	Poland	Warsaw	Wulff attended a ceremony commemorating the 40th anniversary of Willy Brandt's Kniefall von Warschau hosted by President Bronisław Komorowski and visited the Monument to the Ghetto Heroes.
27 January 2011	Poland	Oświęcim	Wulff delivered a speech at the ceremony commemorating the 66th anniversary of the liberation of the Auschwitz concentration camp.
10 February 2011	Spain; Portugal	Madrid; Lisbon	Wulff was received by King Juan Carlos I of Spain and met with Prime Minister José Luis Rodríguez Zapatero. In Portugal, he met with President Aníbal Cavaco Silva, Prime Minister José Sócrates and the President of the Assembly of the Republic, Jaime Gama.
26–28 February 2011	Kuwait; Qatar	Kuwait City; Doha	The German President attended a meeting for several heads of states, which was organized by Sabah Al-Ahmad Al-Jaber Al-Sabah, the Emir of Kuwait, on the occasion of the 50th anniversary of the independence from the United Kingdom, as well as the 20th anniversary of the liberation from Iraqi troops. Wulff also met with the Emir of Qatar Hamad bin Khalifa Al Thani and delivered a speech at Qatar University.
8–9 April 2011	Hungary	Budapest	Wulff attended the 2011 Arraiolos meeting of non-executive presidents of European Union member states, where he gave a speech "On Multiculturalism and the European Identity".
30 April–7 May 2011	Mexico; Costa Rica; Brazil	Teotihuacan; Mexico City; Guanajuato; San José; Brasília; São Paulo	Latin America tour, during which Christian Wulff was formally received by Felipe Calderón, Laura Chinchilla and Dilma Rousseff, the respective Presidents of Mexico, Costa Rica and Brazil. Further appointments included visits to the pre-Hispanic city of Teotihuacan, the International Maize and Wheat Improvement Center and the National Autonomous University of Mexico. Wulff also attended a ceremony celebrating the completion of the renovation of the National Theatre of Costa Rica and visited Braulio Carrillo National Park.
5–6 July 2011	South Africa	Durban	During the 123rd IOC Session, Wulff lobbied for Munich's bid for the 2018 Winter Olympics.
7–8 July 2011	Italy	Rome; Lake Como	Wulff was received by President Giorgio Napolitano and attended the festivities commemorating the 150th anniversary of the Italian unification. He further visited Villa Vigoni, a German-Italian center for cultural exchange.
8–9 September 2011	Poland	Kraków	Wulff was received by President Bronisław Komorowski at the historic old town of Kraków on the occasion of the 20th anniversary of the German-Polish Border Treaty.
26 September 2011	Liechtenstein	Vaduz	Wulff attended the annual informal meeting of the German speaking heads of state, together with President of Austria Heinz Fischer, President of the Swiss Federation Micheline Calmy-Rey and Crown Prince Alois of Liechtenstein.
26–27 September 2011	Slovakia	Bratislava; Kežmarok	Wulff was received by President Ivan Gašparovič and met with Prime Minister Iveta Radičová and Speaker of the Parliament Richard Sulík. He opened an exhibition about the history of the Carpathian Germans.
16–17 October 2011	Afghanistan	Kabul; Mazar-i-Sharif; Kunduz	In Kabul, Wulff was received by President Hamid Karzai and delivered a speech on human rights at the German embassy. He paid visits to Bundeswehr forces at Camp Marmal, a training center for Afghan police forces and met with humanitarian workers and soldiers in Kunduz.
23–28 October 2011	Japan	Tokyo; Fukushima; Yokkaichi; Naruto	State visit on occasion of the 150th anniversary of bilateral Germany–Japan relations, during which the German President was accompanied by a delegation of German trade representatives and businesspeople: Wulff met with Emperor Akihito, Crown Prince Naruhito and Prime Minister Yoshihiko Noda. He gave a speech "On the Responsibilities of Technical Advancement" at the University of Tsukuba and visited the area affected by the 2011 Tōhoku earthquake and tsunami as well as the former Bandō prisoner-of-war camp.
14 November 2011	Poland	Wrocław	Wulff attended a commemorative act celebrating the 200th anniversary of the University of Wrocław, together with President of Poland Bronisław Komorowski and President of Ukraine Viktor Yanukovych.
28 November–2 December 2011	Bangladesh; Indonesia	Dhaka; Jakarta	During these state visits, Wulff was formally received by President of Bangladesh Zillur Rahman and later by President of Indonesia Susilo Bambang Yudhoyono. He met further politicians of the respective countries, including Prime Minister of Bangladesh Sheikh Hasina, Foreign Minister Dipu Moni and ASEAN Secretary General Surin Pitsuwan. Places visited include the Jatiyo Smriti Soudho memorial and Istiqlal Mosque, Jakarta. Wulff delivered speeches at University of Dhaka and University of Indonesia.
8–13 December 2011	Oman; Qatar; United Arab Emirates; Kuwait	Muscat; Nizwa; Doha; Abu Dhabi; Kuwait City	Touring the countries of the Arab peninsula, Wulff was received by the respective heads of state Sultan of Oman Qaboos bin Said al Said, the Emir of Qatar Hamad bin Khalifa Al Thani, the President of the United Arab Emirates Khalifa bin Zayed Al Nahyan and the Emir of Kuwait, Sabah Al-Ahmad Al-Jaber Al-Sabah. Places visited include the Sultan Qaboos Grand Mosque, the German University of Technology in Oman, Zayed University, Sheikh Zayed Grand Mosque and Masdar City. Among other appointments, Wulff attended the opening of the 4th Forum of the Alliance of Civilizations. On 12 December, being "on the way to the Emir", Wulff made a controversial call to Kai Diekmann, the chief editor of Bild that sparked the Causa Wulff, which would ultimately lead to the resignation of the President.
23 December 2011	Czech Republic	Prague	State funeral of Václav Havel.
10–11 February 2012	Finland	Helsinki	Wulff attended the 2012 Arraiolos meeting of non-executive presidents of European Union member states, hosted by Finnish President-elect Sauli Niinistö.
13–15 February 2012	Italy	Rome; Milan; Bari	State visit on invitation of President Giorgio Napolitano, which put a focus on the economic relations between the two countries.
