= Freedom: A Plea =

2012 book by Joachim Gauck

Freedom. A Plea
- Author: Joachim Gauck
- Original title: Freiheit. Ein Plädoyer
- Language: German
- Publisher: Kösel
- Publication date: 2012
- Pages: 64
- ISBN: 978-3-466-37032-0

Freedom. A Plea (German: Freiheit. Ein Plädoyer) is a book by Joachim Gauck, the President of Germany, released on 20 February 2012, the day after his nomination. In the book, consisting of 64 pages, Gauck describes his thoughts on freedom, democracy, human rights and tolerance. The book calls for the defense of freedom and human rights around the globe, particularly in "communist, fanatical islamist or despotic states." He also defends market economy.

The book has been referred to as his political program, and as echoing the peaceful revolution of 1989.

== Bibliography ==
- Joachim Gauck, Freiheit. Ein Plädoyer, Kösel, München 2012, ISBN 978-3-466-37032-0.
