= Andreas Schulze =

Andreas Schulze may refer to:

- Andreas Schulze (political consultant) (born 1964), German political consultant and press secretary
- Andreas Schulze (artist) (born 1955), German painter

== See also ==
- Andreas Schulz (disambiguation)
