= Causa Wulff =

Series of scandals leading to resignation of German President Christian Wulff

Causa Wulff (English: ~The Wulff Case) refers to several political scandals that ultimately led to the resignation of Christian Wulff as President of the Federal Republic of Germany. In the beginning, there were questions concerning the purchase of a house for which Wulff had accepted a loan from an entrepreneur family with whom he was friends.

In this context, Wulff tried to influence media coverage before the scandal became public. Additional investigations were started into Wulff's political dealings with various entrepreneurs with whom he and his family spent their private vacations. Since it was not clear who had paid for these holidays, Wulff was subsequently accused of favoritism and unethical behavior. The district attorney's office in Hanover requested the lifting of Wulff's immunity on February 16, 2012. He resigned as German President the next day. He was acquitted of all corruption charges in February 2014.

== Background ==
In January 2010, German media reported that Christian Wulff, then Minister-President of Lower Saxony, had accepted a complimentary flight upgrade from Air Berlin for a family trip to Miami on September 15, 2009. In doing so, he violated ministerial laws of Lower Saxony, which prohibit members of state government from accepting gifts worth more than 10 Euro. Subsequently, Wulff paid Air Berlin the 3,000 Euro the flights would have cost. Following this incident, the Green faction in Lower Saxony's state parliament began a parliamentary inquiry to find out more about business dealings between Wulff and Egon Geerkens, a local entrepreneur. Responding to the inquiry, the State Chancellery of Lower Saxony denied any business relationship between Wulff and Geerkens. In June 2010, Wulff was elected German President.

Following rumors about possible favors obtained by Wulff in connection with the purchase of a house in early 2009, the news magazine Der Spiegel contacted the local registry of deeds on December 14, 2010 to request access to his files. The request was denied on December 16, 2010, prompting Der Spiegel to call on the Higher Regional Court in Celle to overturn that decision. After that court only partially overturned the earlier determination, Der Spiegel appealed to the Federal Court of Justice, which sustained the appeal and ordered the registry of deeds to grant the news magazine access to Wulff's files. On October 20, 2011, Der Spiegel accessed the registry of deeds and discovered that the house had a lien of 500,000 Euro against it and that the Stuttgart-based BW Bank had provided a financing loan of 415,000 Euro.

== Loan scandal ==
In an email sent to Wulff on November 28, 2011, the German tabloid Bild requested additional information concerning the details of the house purchase. On December 5, 2011 Olaf Glaeseker, then Wulff's spokesperson, provided a copy of the loan agreement, which showed that entrepreneur Egon Geerkens’ wife Edith had loaned 500,000 Euro to Wulff in the fall of 2008. The loan had a very favorable interest rate of only four percent and contained no provisions for repayment.

On December 10, 2011, Bild contacted Wulff again by email and asked why he had not disclosed the loan contract with Edith Geerkens when responding to the parliamentary inquiry in February 2010 and whether he had tried to deceive the state parliament of Lower Saxony. In addition, Bild requested detailed information about financial transactions between Geerkens and Wulff. At the time of this request, Wulff was on an official visit to Dubai.

On December 12, 2011, Bild reported the loan from Edith Geerkens to Wulff and raised the question whether he had misled Lower Saxony's State Parliament in February 2010.

On December 13, 2011, the German Federal Presidential Office confirmed Edith Geerken's loan to Wulff and declared that he had correctly responded to the parliamentary inquiry, as the funds were provided by Mrs. Geerkens and that there was therefore no business relationship between Wulff and Egon Geerkens.

On December 15, 2011, Wulff issued a written statement reiterating that he did not have a business relationship with Mr. Geerkens and that he had correctly responded to the parliamentary inquiry. At the same time, he expressed regret that he may have created a wrong impression. Wulff declared that he had paid back Edith Geerkens in full in March 2010 by taking on a short-term, flexible-interest rate loan from Stuttgart-based BW-Bank through contacts arranged by Egon Geerkens. In the meantime, Wulff said, the loan had been converted into a long-term loan.

In an article published on December 16, 2011, Der Spiegel quoted Egon Geerkens as saying he had led the loan negotiations with Wulff. While the money did indeed come from his wife's bank account, Egon Geerkens stated that he had signed the cheque and given it to Wulff.

On December 18, 2011, Wulff's lawyers published a list of personal holiday trips where he had been a house guest with friends. Six such trips were listed between 2003 and 2010, including stays with Mr. and Mrs. Geerkens, with Carsten Maschmeyer and Wolf-Dieter Baumgartl. One day later, journalists were given access to this list along with documents pertaining to the controversial loan.

On December 21, 2011, Wulff's lawyer confirmed that Egon Geerkens was involved in the loan negotiations and that he also participated in the prior search for a suitable property.

The following day, Wulff suddenly relieved his long-time spokesman and advisor Olaf Glaeseker of his duties. German media reported that Glaeseker tendered his resignation because of fears that the ongoing investigation could compromise his family's privacy. On December 22, 2011, Wulff also held a press conference where he apologized for his conduct in connection with the loan scandal. Wulff conceded that he should have made his personal records available more quickly, "that was not straightforward and I am sorry," he said. At the same time, he stressed his desire to stay in office and asked the German people trust him. That same day, the district attorney's office in Hanover also announced that it would not start a formal investigation into Wulff's loan dealings.

In the evening of December 22, reports surfaced that in March 2010, the government of Lower Saxony under Wulff may have given a false response to a parliamentary inquiry related to the funding and organization of the so-called "Nord-Sued Dialog", an event designed to promote the public image of the states of Lower Saxony and Baden-Wuerttemberg. In March 2010, the state government of Lower Saxony had denied any financial or organizational ties to this event, which had been organized by the event manager Manfred Schmidt.

On December 27, 2011, it became known that the supervisory board of BW-Bank, which had provided Wulff with a loan to pay back the Geerkens loan, requested additional information concerning this transaction as the bank had previously not been informed of the loan.

On December 30, 2011, BW-Bank provided the German public with the details of its business relationship with Wulff. Accordingly, the first talks between Wulff and the bank started in December 2009 and were arranged by Egon Geerkens. On March 21, 2010, these negotiations led to the signing of a "short-term, flexible-interest rate loan" which Wulff used to pay back Edith Geerkens. On December 12, 2011, the bank sent Wulff a contract to convert the short-term flexible interest-rate loan into a long-term loan. BW-Bank received the contract signed by Wulff on December 21. The contract mentions January 16, 2012 as the start date. Critics charged that Wulff had not yet finalized the long-term loan when he made his public statement on December 15, 2011. In response, Wulff's lawyers declared that the interest rate for this loan had already been fixed as of November 15, 2011.

On December 31, 2011, Der Spiegel raised the question whether the conditions of Wulff's BW-Bank loan were somehow connected to his role in the takeover of Porsche by Volkswagen. As member of the Volkswagen supervisory board, Wulff played an important role in making the takeover possible. However, all parties concerned denied any connection to the BW-Bank loan.

== Media scandal ==
On December 31, 2011 it was reported that Wulff had tried to call Bild editor-in-chief Kai Diekmann on December 12, 2011, one day before the tabloid's first article on the loan scandal. Wulff, who was on a state visit to the Persian Gulf at the time, left an aggressive message on Diekmann's mailbox and threatened to take legal steps against the relevant journalists if Bild were to publish the article. In this context, Wulff also spoke of a "final break" and "war" between him and Bild. Furthermore, Wulff also tried to intervene by calling Matthias Doepfner, CEO of Axel-Springer, the publishing house that owns Bild, and left a similarly aggressive message on his mailbox. Doepfner called Wulff back but rejected his demands. Two days later, Wulff apologized to Diekmann for his message. After Wulff's attempts to interfere with Bild, coverage of the loan scandal became public he was widely criticized.

== TV interview and 400 questions ==
On January 4, 2012, Wulff was interviewed by both the ARD and ZDF German national television channels. Wulff admitted personal wrongdoing, and referred to his call to Kai Diekmann as a "grave mistake". Wulff indicated that by calling Diekmann he had only tried to delay, but not to prevent publication of the article. In contrast, Wulff defended both his private vacations with entrepreneur friends and the personal loan from Edith Geerkens. Wulff declared that journalists had sent him a list of more than 400 questions, and announced that he would publish all questions and answers on the Internet.

Kai Diekmann rejected Wulff's characterization of his mailbox message and asked for the president's permission to make the recording public. Wulff did not authorize the release of the message. In contrast to Wulff's earlier announcement that all questions and answers related to the loan scandal would be published online, his law firm issued only a six-page summary on January 5, 2012 and placed it online, as a press release. On January 10, 2012 Wulff's lawyer declared that attorney-client privilege prevented a more detailed release of information. Within a week several newspapers began making use of their right to publish their own enquiries with the respective responses. On January 18, 2012 after a barrage of criticism from within Wulff's own party, including Chancellor Merkel, his lawyer released a total of 237 pages with question and answers related to the loan scandal and put it online. His lawyer also presented online transcripts of legally released interviews by journalists.

== David Groenewold and Nord-Süd-Dialog ==
On January 14, 2012 it was reported that David Groenewold, a media executive, had invited the Wulff couple to the Octoberfest 2008 in Munich and covered part of their hotel bill - without their knowledge, according to Groenewold. On January 16, 2012 the district attorney's office in Hanover declared that there was not yet an initial suspicion but that investigations were still ongoing - especially in light of Wulff's hotel upgrade paid for by Groenewold that had just become public.

In connection with Nord-Süd-Dialog it was reported on January 18 that Wulff had become actively involved in contacting potential sponsors. A spokesperson for Talanx, an insurance company, confirmed that its CEO Herbert Haas had been approached by Wulff. Talanx ended up sponsoring the event to the tune of 10,000 Euro.

On January 19, 2012 the district attorney's office in Hanover searched the home and offices of Wulff's former spokesman Olaf Glaeseker as part of its investigation into potential corruption in connection with Nord-Süd-Dialog. The raid was based on accusations that Glaeseker, during his time in public office, had strongly promoted the event's organization and fundraising activities in exchange for free personal holidays in the vacation homes of Nord-Süd-Dialog event manager Manfred Schmidt. Schmidt's offices were also searched on the same day.

On January 20, 2012 it became known that the state chancellery of Lower Saxony led by Wulff was actively involved in conducting Nord-Süd-Dialog in 2009. For example, Wulff's then-spokesman Olaf Glaeseker had requested 44 students from the Hanover's Medical University as service personnel but had failed to pay the subsequent invoice sent by the state of Lower Saxony. Furthermore, Glaeseker had instructed the Lower Saxonian agriculture ministry to pay for 800 cook books that were distributed to the guests of the Nord-Sued-Dialog. A few days later, on January 24, 2012 it was confirmed that Glaeseker had also reached out to potential sponsors of the Nord-Sued-Dialog 2009 on behalf of Wulff. On January 26, 2012 the district attorney's office in Hanover ordered a search of Glaeseker's former office in the German Federal Presidential Office and seized various documents and computers.

== Developments leading up to the Resignation ==
On January 30, 2012, it became known that Egon Geerkens had been a client of Wulff's former law firm until 2004. Furthermore, Geerkens had rented office space to the law firm until 2007. In response, the law firm declared that Wulff had not worked for them since 1994. This was confirmed by Wulff's lawyer.

Following media reports that the Wulff couple had benefited from exceptionally favorable conditions in connection with the leasing of an Audi Q3, the district attorney's office in Berlin began an investigation into potential favoritism. Wulff's lawyer and Audi rejected the allegations. In this context, Audi declared that the agreed monthly leasing rate of 850 Euro was "in line with market conditions".

On February 8, 2012, there were media reports about a joint vacation of the Wulff family and David Groenewold on the island of Sylt that was booked and paid for by Groenewold. In this context, Wulff declared that he had immediately reimbursed Groenewold for his share of the hotel bill in cash when he checked out of the hotel.

As David Groenewold had previously received credit guarantees from Lower Saxony worth several million Euro, German media reported on February 9, 2012 that the district attorney's office in Hanover had started an investigation into potential favoritism charges in connection with the Sylt vacation.

On February 16 the district attorney's office in Hanover requested the lifting of Wulff's presidential immunity due to well-founded initial suspicions of favoritism and unethical behavior.

On February 17, 2012, Wulff resigned as German Federal President. Explaining his resignation, Wulff stated that "(the German people's) trust and thus his effectiveness have been seriously damaged" and that "for this reason it is no longer possible for him to exercise the office of president at home and abroad as required." A new presidential election was required within a month to elect his successor. Until a new President was elected, Horst Seehofer of the Christian Social Union (CSU) was acting president. The new president, Joachim Gauck, was elected on 18 March by a Federal Convention.

== Further developments ==
After the request by the district attorney's office in Hanover to lift Wulff's immunity had been leaked to the press, there were media reports that the prosecutors had questioned Wulff's explanation that he reimbursed Groenewold in cash when checking out of the hotel in Sylt in August 2008. The investigations showed no corresponding withdrawals on Wulff's bank account that would back up his claim. In view of Wulff's negative account balance leading up to the Sylt vacation, prosecutors deemed the possibility that Wulff had kept a cash gift from December 2007 until August 2008 as "economically unwise".

On February 26, 2012, further details emerged regarding the cash gifts that Wulff received in December 2007. According to Wulff, he received 1,000 euro as a birthday present and a Christmas present of 2,500 euro from his mother-in-law to his wife Bettina. Six days after receipt of the birthday gift, the Wulffs left for a Sylt vacation in December 2007. Regarding the Sylt trip in August 2008, the district attorney's office said that they had questioned Wulff's cash reimbursement explanation because there was an eight-month gap between the Christmas gift in December and the Sylt vacation in August 2008, and because Wulff's bank account was in the red by more than 10,000 euro in July 2008.

On March 1, 2012, the district attorney searched David Groenewold's home and offices with his permission and seized a large volume of documents and data.

One day later, the district attorney searched Wulff's personal home and seized one computer among other things. Since the search was conducted with the permission of the Wulff family, no search warrant was required.

On June 1, it became known that the district attorney's office in Berlin had closed its probe into allegations that Wulff had engaged in unethical behavior in connection with, among other things, the leasing of an Audi Q3. The investigation did not yield firm evidence backing up the accusations.

In January 2013, a report by the State Police Office in Hanover became public indicated that the investigators were not able to find evidence of corruption that could be used in court. Wulff's mother-in-law had confirmed his statement regarding the cash gifts to her daughter. According to Wulff, he had used the money to pay for the hotel. Furthermore, investigators confirmed the legality of Wulff's room upgrade at a Munich hotel by David Groenewold in 2008. Since Wulff had the right to be reimbursed for this trip by the State of Lower Saxony, he did not derive a personal benefit from the upgrade. According to the investigators, this refuted the claims of corruption levelled at Wulff.

On January 26, 2013, German media reported about a letter from David Groenewold to Wulff dated September 29, 2008. The letter had been turned over by the State Chancellery of Lower Saxony to the district attorney's office in Hanover in late 2012. In the letter, Groenewold had asked Wulff for support in the marketing of his movie John Rabe. In particular, the letter referred to the Siemens which Groenewold had not yet managed to secure as a sponsor. In late 2008, Wulff wrote a letter to Siemens CEO Peter Loescher and asked him to support the movie. The district attorney's office subsequently called on two of Wulff's former aides as witnesses in the investigation.

In February 2013 further details emerged about Wulff's personal finances between 2007 and 2011. According to the district attorney leading the investigation, Wulff found himself in a permanently strained financial situation with a bank account that was at times more than 80,000 in the red.

In March 2013 the Hanover district attorney offered to settle the case in exchange for a fine. On April 9, Wulff announced that he had rejected this deal. Three days later the prosecution filed corruption charges against Wulff. The only remaining allegation against him concerned a Munich hotel and food bill of 770 euro paid by Groenewold. On August 27, 2013, the Hanover regional court announced that it would try Wulff on accepting unfair advantages, after downgrading the initial corruption charges.

On February 27, 2014, two years after his resignation, Christian Wulff was acquitted of all corruption charges by the Hanover regional court.
