= Roland Jahn =

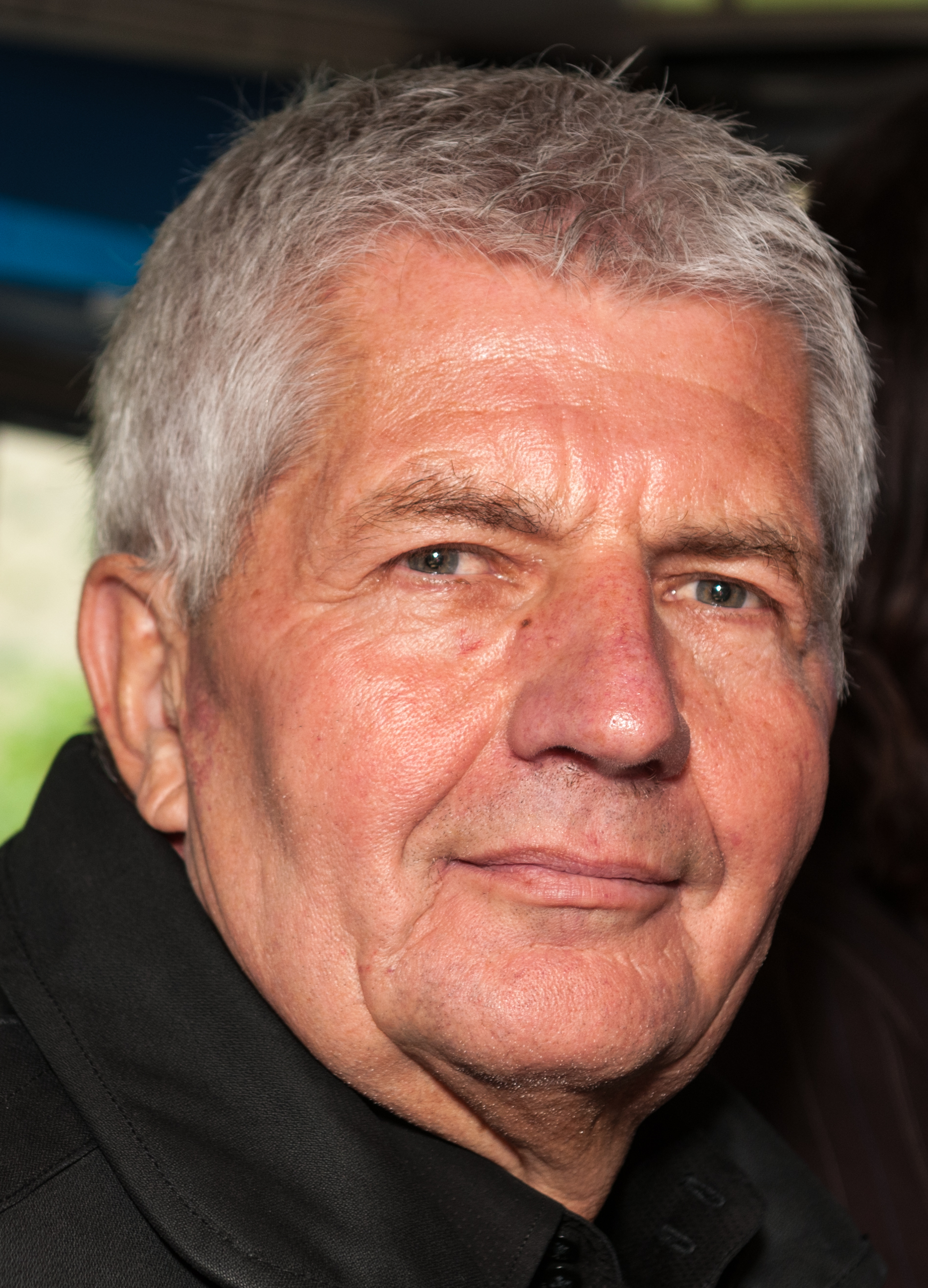
- Jahn in January 2012

Federal Commissioner for the Stasi Records
- In office 14 March 2011 – 17 June 2021
- Preceded by: Marianne Birthler
- Succeeded by: Position abolished

Personal details
- Born: 14 July 1953 (age 72) Jena, East Germany
- Party: Independent

Roland Jahn (born 14 July 1953) is a German journalist and former East German dissident who took office as Federal Commissioner for the Stasi Records in March 2011.

== Education and activism ==
Born in Jena, Jahn began to study economics in 1975 but was forced to end his studies in 1977 after he criticized the expulsion of singer-activist Wolf Biermann from East Germany to West Germany. He then worked as a transport worker at the VEB Carl Zeiss Jena. Jahn became active in protests opposing militarization and censorship in East Germany, resulting in multiple arrests until he was sentenced to 22 months imprisonment in 1982 for displaying a flag of the forbidden Polish non-communist trade union Solidarity. He was released after several weeks following international protests, formed an activist group and continued to demonstrate. Jahn was arrested and forcibly extradited to West Germany via train on 8 June 1983 under order of the Minister of State Security Erich Mielke. Jahn's East German lawyer Wolfgang Schnur was later revealed to have worked for the Ministry for State Security (Stasi).

Jahn's East German citizenship was revoked in 1983 and he began to work as a journalist in West Berlin. Jahn continued to support East German dissidents, smuggled cameras to them, and relayed their activities to West German media. His reports were broadcast on West Berlin television and illegally picked up by East Germans; a smuggled camera allowed broadcasting footage of the Monday demonstrations in East Germany. Jahn was politically active in West Germany and demonstrated against rearmament, resulting in a 30-day prison sentence in West Berlin in December 1985. Jahn remained a target of Stasi spying until the German reunification in 1990 and he documented the following downfall of the former East German government and social change as a journalist. He has been employed as a journalist for the public Berlin-Brandenburg Broadcasting program Kontraste since 1991 and received the Order of Merit of the Federal Republic of Germany in 1998.

== Federal Commissioner for the Stasi Records, 2010–present ==
In 2010, Jahn was nominated as Federal Commissioner for the Stasi Records by the Christian Democratic Union in the Federal Diet of Germany. His nomination was approved on 28 January 2011 by a majority of the Federal Diet. Jahn's term of office will last five years and he will be charged with public access and administration of the Stasi Records Agency. Jahn stated that he does not intend to use his position for retribution and instead "want[s] justice".

== Other activities ==
- German Institute for Human Rights (DIMR), Member of the Board of Trustees

Civic offices
Preceded by Marianne Birthler	Federal Commissioner for the Stasi Records; 2011–present	Incumbent
