= NKVD Special Camp No. 1 =

Soviet Camp in Brandenburg, Germany

Coordinates: 51.449858°N 13.281942°E

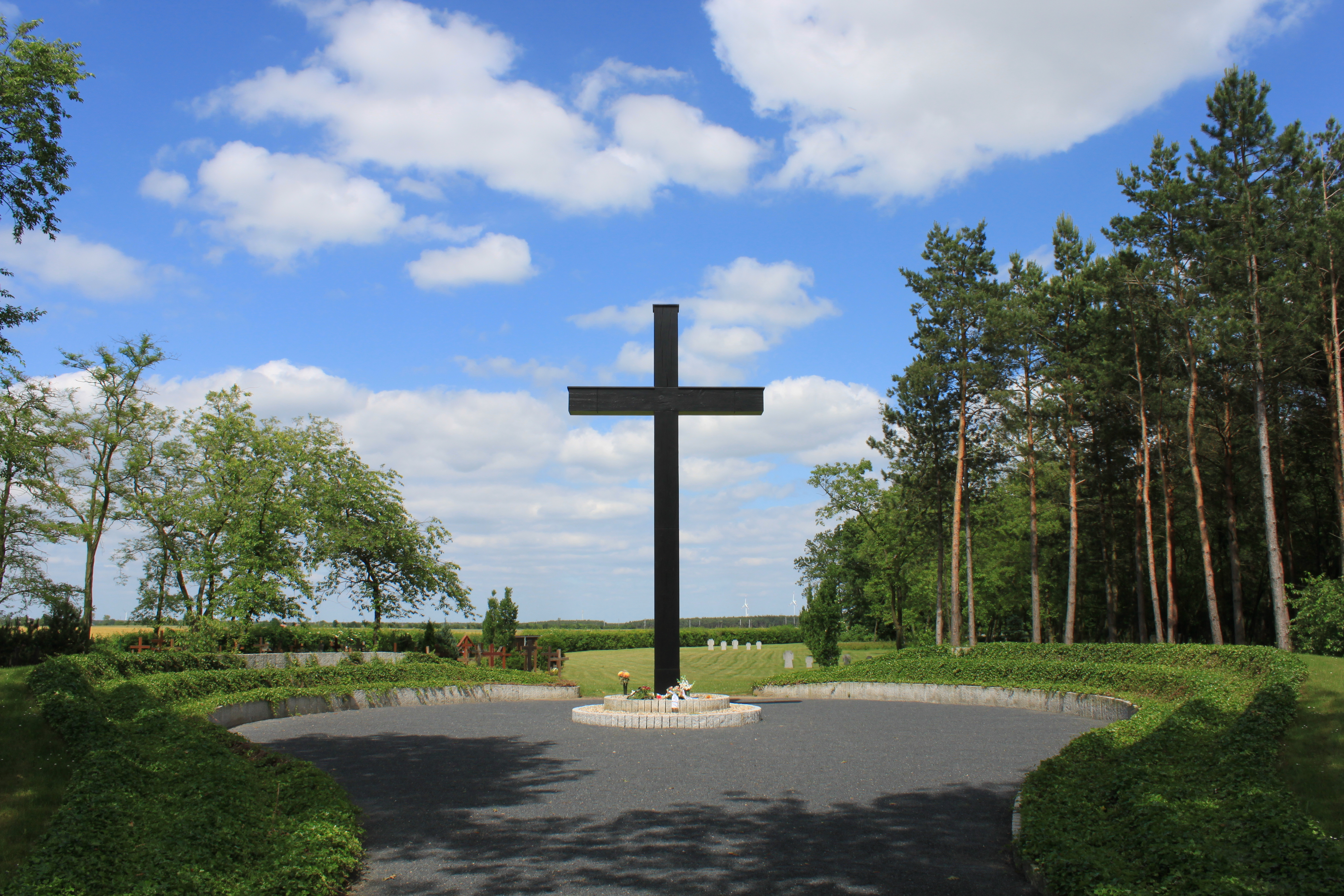
Graves outside the former camp

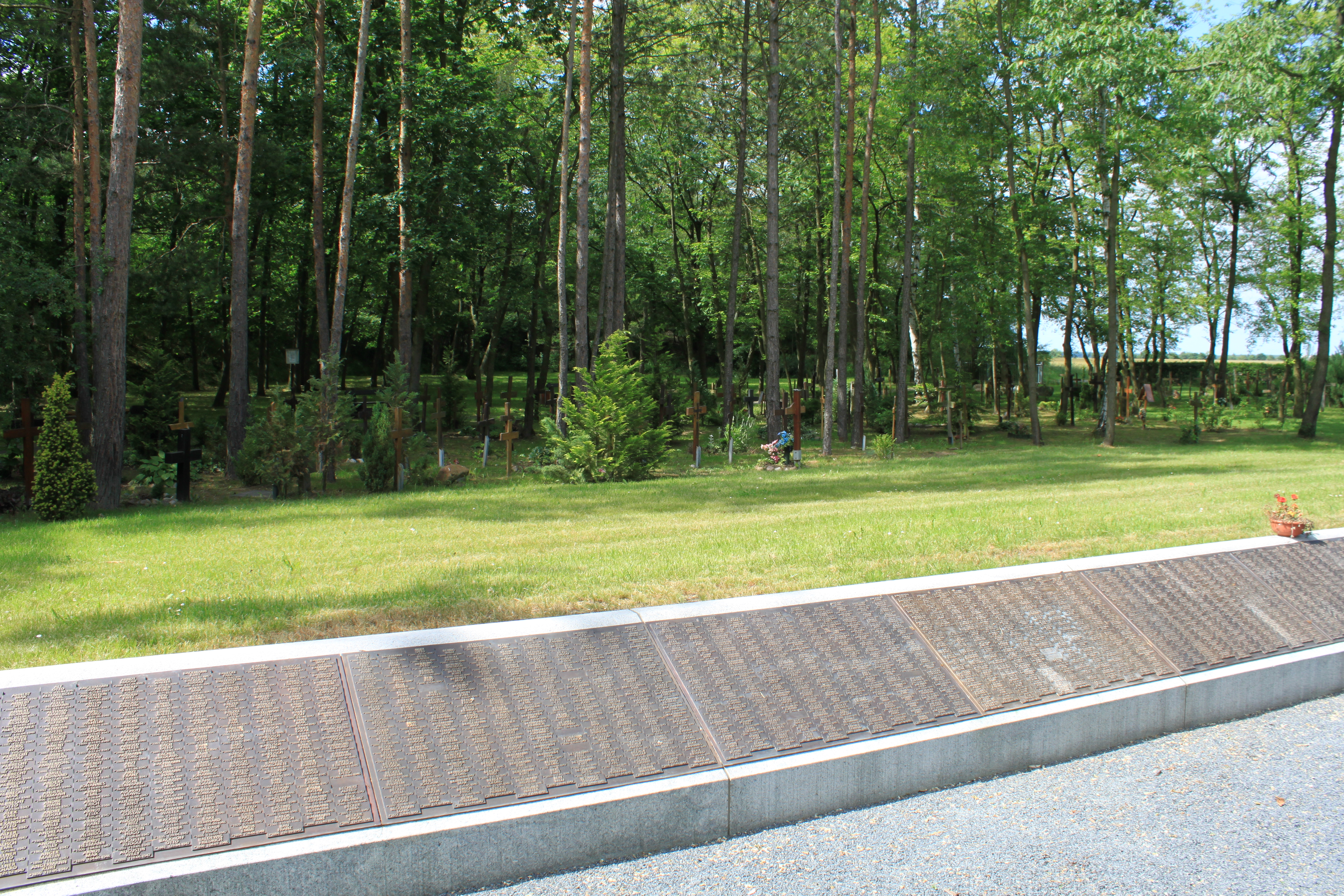
Memorial plaques

The NKVD Special Camp No. 1 (German: Speziallager Nr. 1 Mühlberg) was a special camp operated by the NKVD from 1945 to 1948, during the Soviet occupation of parts of Germany. It was located 4 km to the east of Mühlberg, Brandenburg using the shacks of the former German run prisoners-of-war camp Stalag IV-B. The prisoners mainly consisted of members of the lower and medium ranks of the Nazi Party, German military personnel, youth wrongly accused of belonging to the German Werwolf resistance, and other persons who were regarded by the Soviets as being potentially dangerous like journalists, teachers, policemen, farmers, factory owners and politicians in addition to several arbitrarily accused people. Conditions in the camp were characterized by bad sanitary conditions, malnutrition and lack of basic medical service. The camp had over 21,800 prisoners during its existence, including 1,490 women and over 1,300 teenagers. At most, it held 12,000 prisoners at a time.

In 1946, around 3,000 prisoners were deported to the Gulag in the Soviet Union. On 8 February 1947, a further 1,000 prisoners, mostly youth, were also deported to an NKVD Gulag camp in Siberia, the NKVD Camp No. 7503/11 in Anschero-Sudschensk. In summer 1948, two thirds of the prisoners were released. On 17 September 1948, the remaining 3,000 prisoners were transferred to another NKVD camp, Special Camp No. 2 in Buchenwald. From there, a part was released in 1950, the remaining prisoners were handed over from the Soviets to the East German Communist government and brought to Waldheim on 9 and 13 February 1950, only to be "convicted" in the infamous Waldheim Processes. The camp in Mühlberg ceased operations in 1948.

More than 6,700 of the prisoners (among them 111 teenagers) died due to the bad conditions in the camp. They were all buried in mass graves. Their relatives were not notified. The East German communist government forbade any commemoration. Only following the Fall of Communism in 1989, memorials were erected. In 1992, a central memorial was erected, which is rebuilt with the assistance of the German War Graves Commission. On 6 September 2008, a name plaque with the names of all the victims was officially unveiled.

== Literature ==
- Sigrid Drechsler: Im Schatten von Mühlberg. Kunstverlag Paris, Rudolstadt 1995.
- Ursula Fischer: Zum Schweigen verurteilt. Denunziert, verhaftet, interniert. (1945–1948). Dietz, Berlin 1992, ISBN 3-320-01769-1.
- Jan von Flocken, Michael Klonovsky: Stalins Lager in Deutschland. 1945–1950. Dokumentation, Zeugenberichte. Ullstein, Berlin 1991, ISBN 3-550-07488-3.
- Herbert Hecht: Sibirische Glocken. Selbstverlag, Gernrode 2006.
- Martina Hofmann: Eine Ausstellung über das NKWD-Speziallager Nr.1 Mühlberg/Elbe von 1945 bis 1948. Ein Beitrag zur Zeitgeschichte. 1994.
- Initiativgruppe Mühlberg e. V. Kriegsgefangenenlager Stalag IV B, Speziallager Nr. 11 des sowj. NKWD. (Flyer).
- Initiativgruppe Lager Mühlberg e. V. (Hrsg.): Totenbuch – Speziallager Nr. 1 des sowjetischen NKWD, Mühlberg/Elbe. Initiativgruppe Lager Mühlberg e. V., Mühlberg/Elbe 2008, ISBN 978-3-00-026999-8.
- Achim Kilian: Einzuweisen zur völligen Isolierung. NKWD-Speziallager Mühlberg/Elbe 1945–1948. 2. erweiterte Auflage. Forum Verlag, Leipzig 1993, ISBN 3-86151-028-6.
- Achim Kilian: Mühlberg. 1938–1948. Ein Gefangenenlager mitten in Deutschland. Böhlau, Köln u. a. 2001, ISBN 3-412-10201-6 (Geschichte und Politik in Sachsen 17). This book contains the most comprehensive collection of historical and statistical facts on the NKVD special camp No. 1.
- Erhard Krätzschmar: … von Wurzen über Mühlberg nach Sibirien … Betroffene erinnern sich. (Bittere Jugendjahre 1945–1950). Swing, Colditz 1995. (online)
- Helmut Leppert: Odyssee einer Jugend. 8. Auflage. Initiativgruppe Lager Mühlberg e. V., Mühlberg/Elbe 2010.
- Helma von Nerée: Erinnern, nie vergessen. NKWD-Lager Mühlberg/Elbe. Selbstverlag, Marsberg 2006.
- John Noble: I Was a Slave in Russia: An American Tells His Story. New York: Devin-Adair, 1960. pp 46–59.
- Siegfried Rulc: Unvollständige Chronik 1945–1950. Ein Tagebuch zur Werwolf-Legende. 2. Auflage. S. Rulc, Berlin 1996, ISBN 3-00-002235-X.
- Rolf Schneider: Mit siebzehn hinter Stacheldraht - von Mühlberg bis Sibirien. Wegberg 2005
- Elisabeth Schuster: Reite Schritt, Schnitter Tod! Leben und Sterben im Speziallager Nr. 1 des NKWD Mühlberg, Elbe. With a preface by Joachim Gauck. German War Graves Commission/Scribeo-Verlag, Kassel 2004, ISBN 3-936592-02-0
- Paul Weisshuhn: Ich komme wieder! Erinnerungen eines Überlebenden. NKWD-Speziallager Mühlberg 1945–1948. Herausgegeben von Markolf Weisshuhn. Edition Noëma, Stuttgart 2003, ISBN 3-89821-312-9.
