= Marianne Birthler =

German politician

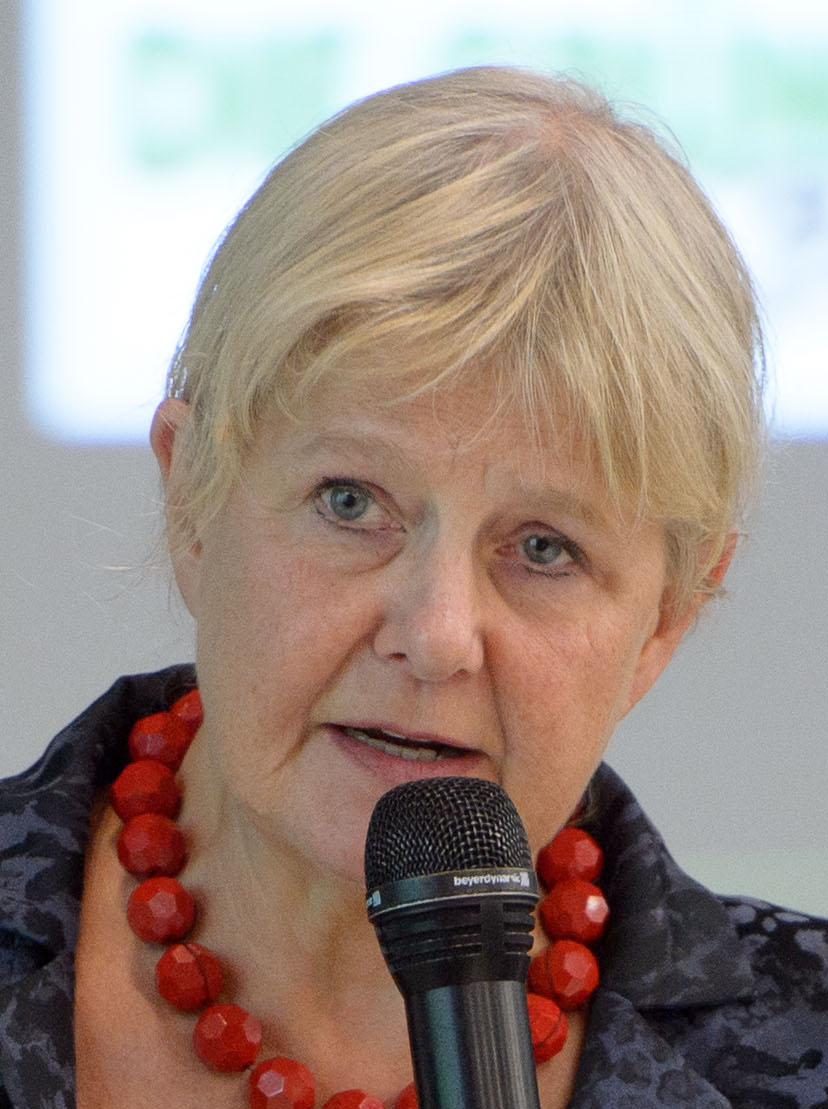

Federal Commissioner for the Stasi Records
- In office 10 October 2000 – 14 March 2011
- Preceded by: Joachim Gauck
- Succeeded by: Roland Jahn

Minister for Education, Youth and Sport of Brandenburg
- In office 22 November 1990 – 29 October 1992
- Minister-President: Manfred Stolpe
- Preceded by: Office established
- Succeeded by: Roland Resch

Member of the Landtag of Brandenburg
- In office 26 October 1990 – 30 September 1992
- Preceded by: Constituency established
- Succeeded by: Peter Schüler
- Constituency: Alliance 90/The Greens List

Member of the Bundestag for Volkskammer
- In office 3 October 1990 – 20 December 1990
- Preceded by: Constituency established
- Succeeded by: Constituency abolished

Member of the Volkskammer for Berlin
- In office 5 April 1990 – 2 October 1990
- Preceded by: Constituency established
- Succeeded by: Constituency abolished

Personal details
- Born: 22 January 1948 (age 78) Berlin, Germany
- Party: Alliance 90/The Greens
- Other political affiliations: Alliance 90 (1990–1993)
- Spouse: Wolfgang Birthler (m. 1968; div. 1983)
- Children: 3
- Education: Fachschule für Außenhandel
- Occupation: Politician; Foreign Trade Employees; catechist
- Website: Heinrich-Böll-Stiftung website

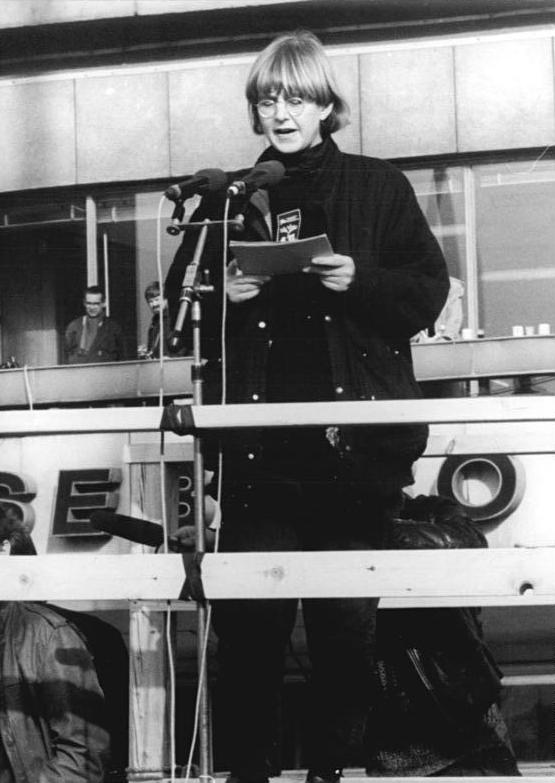
Birthler gives an address during the Alexanderplatz demonstration on 4 November 1989

Marianne Birthler (born 22 January 1948) is a German human rights advocate and politician of the Alliance '90/The Greens. From 2000 to 2011, she served as the Federal Commissioner for the Stasi Records, responsible for investigating the past crimes of the Stasi, the former communist secret police of East Germany. In 2016 she was offered the nomination of the CDU/CSU and her own party for President of Germany, but after some time decided not to run; the parties would have had a majority in the Federal Convention, securing her the election.

== Early life ==
Birthler grew up in East Germany and was active in child and youth work for the Church, first in her parish in Prenzlauer Berg, then as a youth advisor in the City of Berlin from 1987. In 1986 she co-founded a group called Church Solidarity (Solidarische Kirche), which campaigned for greater democracy in the church and in society. In 1988 she joined the Initiative for Peace and Human Rights, which formed part of the resistance to the Soviet-imposed communist regime in the 1980s.

== Political career ==
Birthler was elected to the only democratically elected People's Chamber in the GDR in March 1990, where she served as spokeswoman of the Alliance 90. From German Reunification on 3 October 1990 until the elections of 2 December 1990, she was a member of the Bundestag, the Parliament of Germany. In October 1990, she became a member of the state parliament of Brandenburg, and in November, she was appointed as Minister for Education in the state government of Minister-President Manfred Stolpe. She resigned from the parliament in the summer of 1992 and, in protest over Stolpe's Stasi contacts, from the cabinet in October the same year.

From 1993 to 1994, Birthler was co-spokesperson (i.e., leader, with Ludger Volmer) of the Alliance '90/The Greens. She was awarded the Bundesverdienstkreuz in 1995.

In September 2000, Birthler was appointed by the Parliament of Germany as Federal Commissioner for the Stasi Records, succeeding Joachim Gauck. She was appointed to a second term in January 2006. In February 2011 it was revealed 53 former Stasi agents were employed at the Stasi Records Agency under her leadership, creating a controversy as she prepared to leave the authority the following month. As Federal Commissioner, she has notably been a strong critic of the left party Die Linke, the successor of the Socialist Unity Party of Germany, and has on several occasions criticised the party of being extremist and nominating former Stasi employees as members of parliament. She has also criticised other parties for cooperating with the Die Linke party, warning that the party should not be given political influence.

Birthler was a member of the 2009 Federal Convention, serving as an elector of the President of Germany. Before the election, she strongly criticised the SPD candidate Gesine Schwan for claiming that the GDR was "not an unjust state".

In late 2016, Chancellor Angela Merkel offered Birthler the opportunity to succeed Joachim Gauck as President of Germany; however, Birthler declined the offer.

Together with Berlin architecture firm Graft, Birthler was selected to curate the German pavilion at the 2018 Venice Architecture Bienniale.

== Other activities (selection) ==
- Berlin Wall Memorial, Member of the Board of Trustees
- Heinrich Böll Foundation, Member of the General Assembly
- Bürgerstiftung Berlin, Member of the Board of Trustees
- Evangelische Akademie zu Berlin, Chairwoman of the Advisory Board
- Free University of Berlin, Member of the Board of Trustees
- Friede Springer Foundation, Deputy Chairwoman of the Board of Trustees (since 2011)
- Körber Foundation, Deputy Chairwoman of the Board of Trustees
- Stiftung Mitarbeit, Member of the Board of Trustees
- Zentrum Liberale Moderne, Member of the International Advisory Board
- German Evangelical Church Assembly (DEKT), Member of the Presidium (1993–2005)

== Recognition ==
- 2009 – Max Friedlaender Prize
- 2015 – Hanns Martin Schleyer Prize

== Personal life ==
Birthler was formerly (until 1983) married to veterinarian Wolfgang Birthler, who later became a regional cabinet minister under Minister-President Manfred Stolpe in Brandenburg. They have three daughters.

Civic offices
| Preceded by Joachim Gauck | Federal Commissioner for the Stasi Records; 2000–2011 | Succeeded by Roland Jahn |
