= Stasi Records Agency =

Administration organisation in Germany

Coordinates: 52°31′32.74″N 13°24′48.78″E

- Stasi-Unterlagen-Behörde

Archives overview
- Formed: 29 December 1991
- Preceding Archives: Ministry for State Security (German: Ministerium für Staatssicherheit, commonly known as the Stasi)
- Dissolved: 17 June 2021
- Type: Former Secret Police Archive
- Status: Dissolved, now part of the German Federal Archives
- Headquarters: Karl-Liebknecht-Straße 31/33 Berlin-Lichtenberg, Germany
- Employees: 1,313 (As of 31 December 2020)
- Archives executive: Roland Jahn, Federal Commissioner for the Stasi Records
- Website: www.bundesarchiv.de/en/stasi-records-archive/ (in English)

Map
- Location on a map of Berlin.

The Stasi Records Agency (German: Stasi-Unterlagen-Behörde) was the organisation that administered the archives of the Ministry for State Security (Stasi) of the former German Democratic Republic (East Germany). It was a government agency of the Federal Republic of Germany. It was established when the Stasi Records Act came into force on 29 December 1991. Formally it was called the Federal Commissioner for the Records of the State Security Service of the former German Democratic Republic (German: Bundesbeauftragter für die Unterlagen des Staatssicherheitsdienstes der ehemaligen Deutschen Demokratischen Republik); the official German abbreviation was BStU. On 17 June 2021, the BStU was absorbed into the German Federal Archives (Bundesarchiv).

The Stasi was established on 8 February 1950. It functioned as the secret police, intelligence agency and crime investigation service of the German Democratic Republic (GDR). It grew to have around 270,000 people working for it, including about 180,000 informers, or "unofficial collaborators". It was renamed the "Office for National Security" (German: Amt für Nationale Sicherheit) on 17 November 1989. It was dissolved on 13 January 1990.

The Stasi spied on almost every aspect of East Germans' daily lives, and it carried out international espionage. It kept files on about 5.6 million people and amassed an enormous archive. The archive holds 111 kilometres (69 mi) of files in total. About half of the material is held in the Stasi Records Agency's headquarters in Berlin, and the rest is in its 12 regional offices. As well as written documentation, the archive has audio-visual material such as photos, slides, film, and sound recordings. The Stasi also had an archive of hair, saliva, blood, sweat, urine, stool and body odour samples which its officers collected during interrogations and incarcerations. In addition, Stasi agents broke into people’s homes and workplaces to steal dirty laundry, underwear, and socks.

== Name ==
The agency was formally known by the title of its lead official, the "Federal Commissioner for the Records of the State Security Service of the former German Democratic Republic" (German: Der Bundesbeauftragte für die Unterlagen des Staatssicherheitsdienstes der ehemaligen Deutschen Demokratischen Republik). Due to the unwieldy name, the Commissioner was usually referred to as the "Federal Commissioner for the Stasi Records" (German: Der Bundesbeauftragte für die Stasi-Unterlagen), abbreviated as "BStU". The agency itself was commonly referred to using the last name of the sitting federal commissioner, i.e. "Gauck-", "Birthler-", and "Jahn Agency" (German: Gauck-, Birthler-, & Jahn-Behörde).

It has also been called the Stasi-Unterlagen-Behörde ("Stasi Records Agency" ).

== Organisation ==
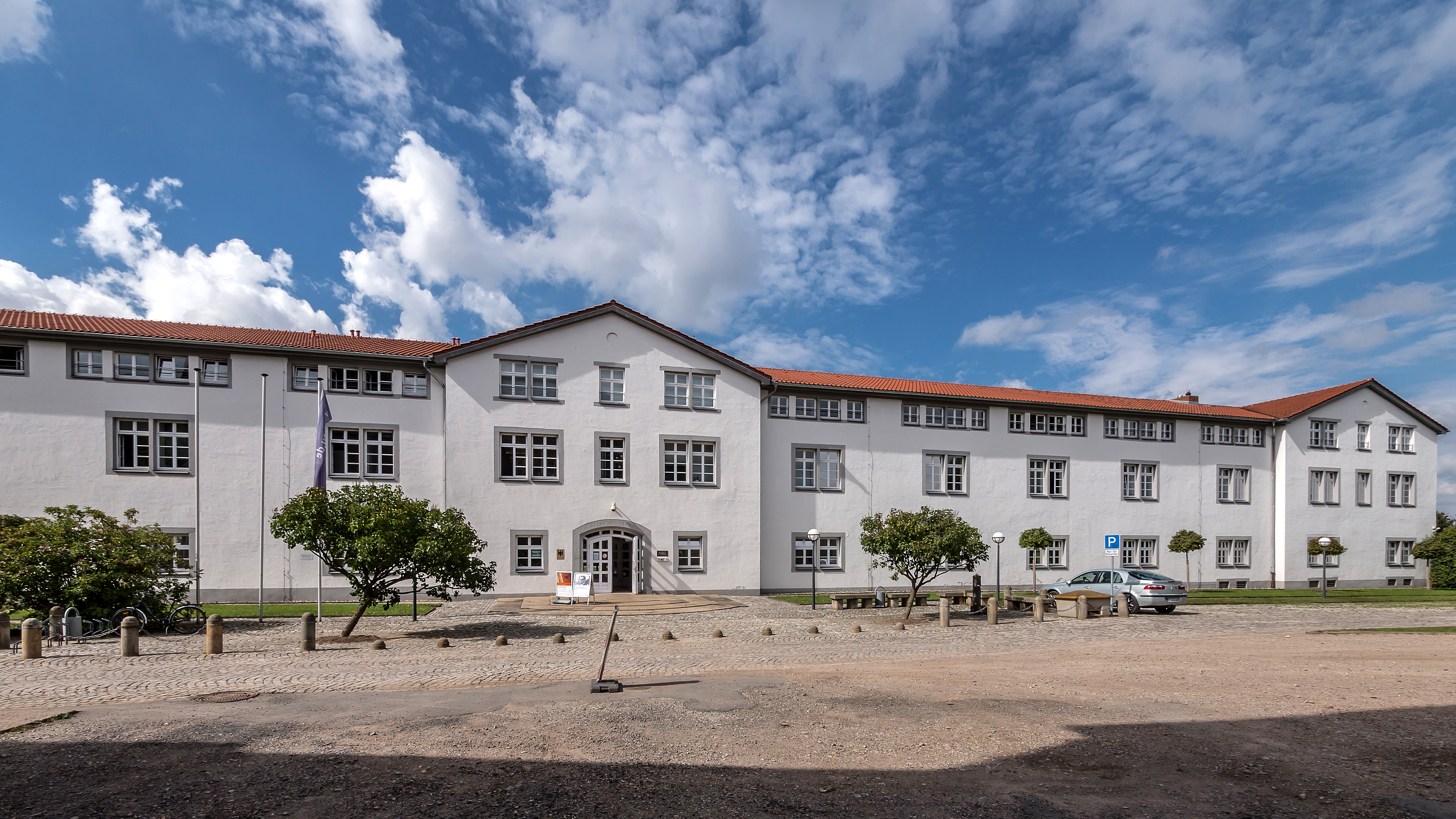
Former Stasi Records Agency, Erfurt, housed in a 17th-century barracks at Petersberg Citadel.

The former head office of the Stasi Records Agency was in the central suburb of Lichtenberg in Berlin, in what was part of the sprawling former Stasi headquarters compound. In addition to providing access to files, it also has exhibitions, tours and public events related to the Stasi and the history of the GDR.

There were also 12 regional offices of the organisation in Dresden, Erfurt, Frankfurt-an-der-Oder, Halle (Saale), Chemnitz, Gera, Leipzig, Magdeburg, Neubrandenburg, Rostock, Schwerin and Suhl.

The offices in Dresden, Erfurt, Frankfurt-an-der-Oder and Halle all had permanent and changing exhibitions, offer tours to the public and host events and educational programmes relating to the activities of the Stasi in their region.

The agency was a member of the Platform of European Memory and Conscience, an organisation founded in October 2011 which brings together public and private institutions in 20 countries which focus on history of the totalitarian regimes in 20th century Europe

=== Federal Commissioners ===
The agency was headed by a Federal Commissioner, elected by the Bundestag.

- Joachim Gauck (1991–2000)
- Marianne Birthler (2000–2011)
- Roland Jahn (2011–2021)

== History ==
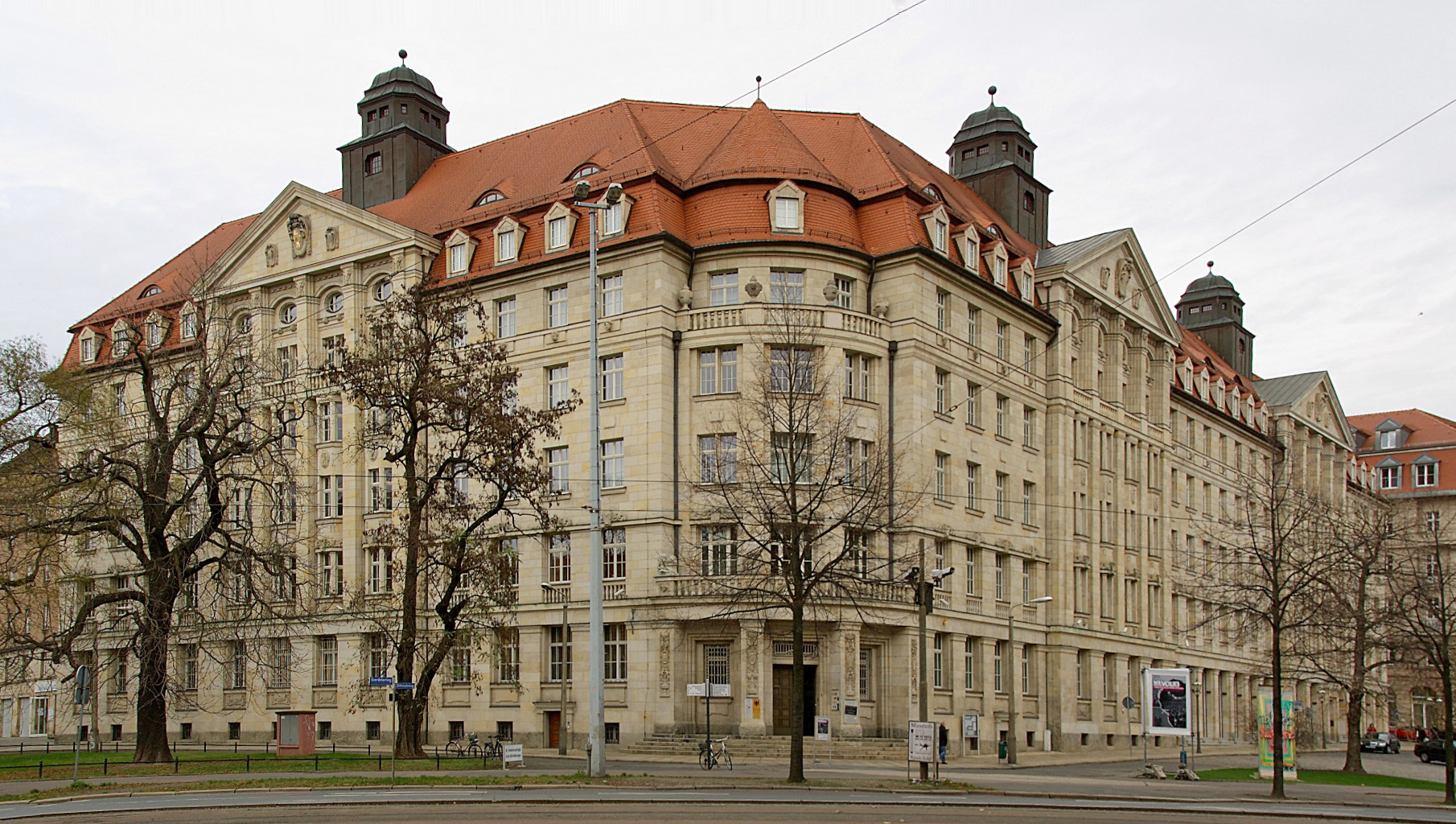
Memorial Site "Runde Ecke", Leipzig, 1990. Former Stasi district headquarters in Leipzig, now a Stasi museum.

After the Central Committee of the Socialist Unity Party stepped down on 3 December 1989, the Stasi became the last bastion of the dictatorship. Citizens were alert to the fact that the Stasi might try to destroy files and records, in order to cover up its activities. On the morning of 4 December, dark smoke was seen coming from the chimneys of the Stasi district headquarters in Erfurt, and it was deduced that files were being burned. With the help of other citizens, a women's group, "Women for Change" (German: Frauen für Veränderung) occupied the building and the neighbouring Stasi remand prison, where they stored files for safekeeping.

This instigated the take over of Stasi buildings all over East Germany. Citizens gained access to the Stasi headquarters in Berlin on 15 January 1990.

After German Reunification in October 1990, Joachim Gauck was appointed Special Commissioner for the Stasi Records. When Stasi Records Act was passed in December 1991, he became first Federal Commissioner for the Stasi Records, heading the newly created Stasi Records Agency. The act sets out the rights of people to view Stasi Records, which they were first able to do on 2 January 1992.

Following Helmut Kohl's implication in the CDU donations scandal, a 2004 decision of the administrative court of Berlin established that the legislature had been empowered to authorize the release of files pertaining to historical, political or public figures, but the reason for access and the nature of the information were relevant to the fundamental rights of the subjects of the files. Access for research was authorized as long as the material was kept confidential and the individual subject was not identified. However, access to recordings or transcripts of private conversations was not authorized, even for research purposes. In general, access for journalism was not authorized, because of the likelihood that the files contained information obtained through surveillance or other rights violations. However, files that apparently came from public statements or information reported elsewhere could be released to the press.

As of January 2015, over 7 million people had applied to view their own Stasi files. In January 2015 the Stasi Records Agency created a digital portal and made files available online, although for privacy reasons no files of living people are available digitally. The website includes information about the 1953 uprising in East Germany and the events leading to the fall of the Berlin Wall.

=== Controversy ===
Controversy arose after an investigation, whose report had been leaked to the media, found out that the BStU at one point employed at least 79 former Stasi members and still employed 52 as of 2009. The great majority of these were hired from the "bodyguards" branch of the Stasi; some were former archivists and some were just technicians. There was suspicion that some of these former Stasi officers managed to manipulate records, so a rule was put in place that no former Stasi officers are allowed to enter the Stasi Archives by themselves. The report recommended, for several reasons besides the issue of former Stasi officers working for the BStU, to integrate the BStU into the German Federal Archives. It also reported there was a constitutionally questionable situation. In summer 2008, the German Parliament decided to found an expert commission to analyze the role and future of the BStU.

== Reconstruction of destroyed files ==
In the early 1990s the BStU began work on reconstructing documents that had been destroyed by Stasi officers and staff before the archives were secured by citizens occupying Stasi offices. The destruction had initially been performed using industrial shredders, but these soon broke down and officers resorted to tearing files by hand before stuffing the pieces into bags that were then meant to be burned or chemically treated. Approximately 16,000 such bags came to be held by the BStU, which estimated that each contained between 2,500 and 3,500 document fragments. By early 2007 the contents of around 350 of these bags had been manually reconstructed by a small team of full-time workers, a task that is being continued by the Federal Archives since it absorbed the BStU. According to the archives, an additional "few thousand" bags containing very finely shredded paper were also secured by the BStU, but these were all disposed of by the agency in 1991 and so cannot be the subject of any attempts at reconstruction.

As part of an effort to increase the speed of reconstruction, the Fraunhofer Institute for Production Systems and Design Technology was awarded a contract in 2003 to develop a computerised system for document reconstruction, which it refers to as "ePuzzler" and which it first deployed in 2007. This pilot project attempted reconstruction on the contents of 400 bags and demonstrated that the concept worked in principle, but a wider deployment was not undertaken due to limitations in scanner technology and concerns over cost efficiency.

== Rosenholz files ==
The Rosenholz files are a collection of microfilmed Stasi files that have information on East Germany's foreign intelligence service employees and informers. They contain 320,000 agent cards and 57,000 spy reports. They were acquired by the CIA shortly after the fall of the Berlin Wall in unclear circumstances. Between 2001 and 2003 the United States gave the files it had, which were on 380 CD-ROMs, to the Stasi Records Agency. Since July 2003, these have been available for viewing. They provide an insight into the Stasi's spying activities in western countries. They have been used to identify Stasi spies and informers, including Lothar Bisky, the chairman of the Party of Democratic Socialism and its successor Party of The Left.

The CIA passed on some of the material to the United Kingdom and other countries. In 2011, the German government asked the UK's MI5 to return the files they have, but they refused due to concerns that British Stasi spies could be exposed.

== See also ==
- Memorial and Education Centre Andreasstraße
