= Olaf Glaeseker =

German political consultant, journalist, publicist

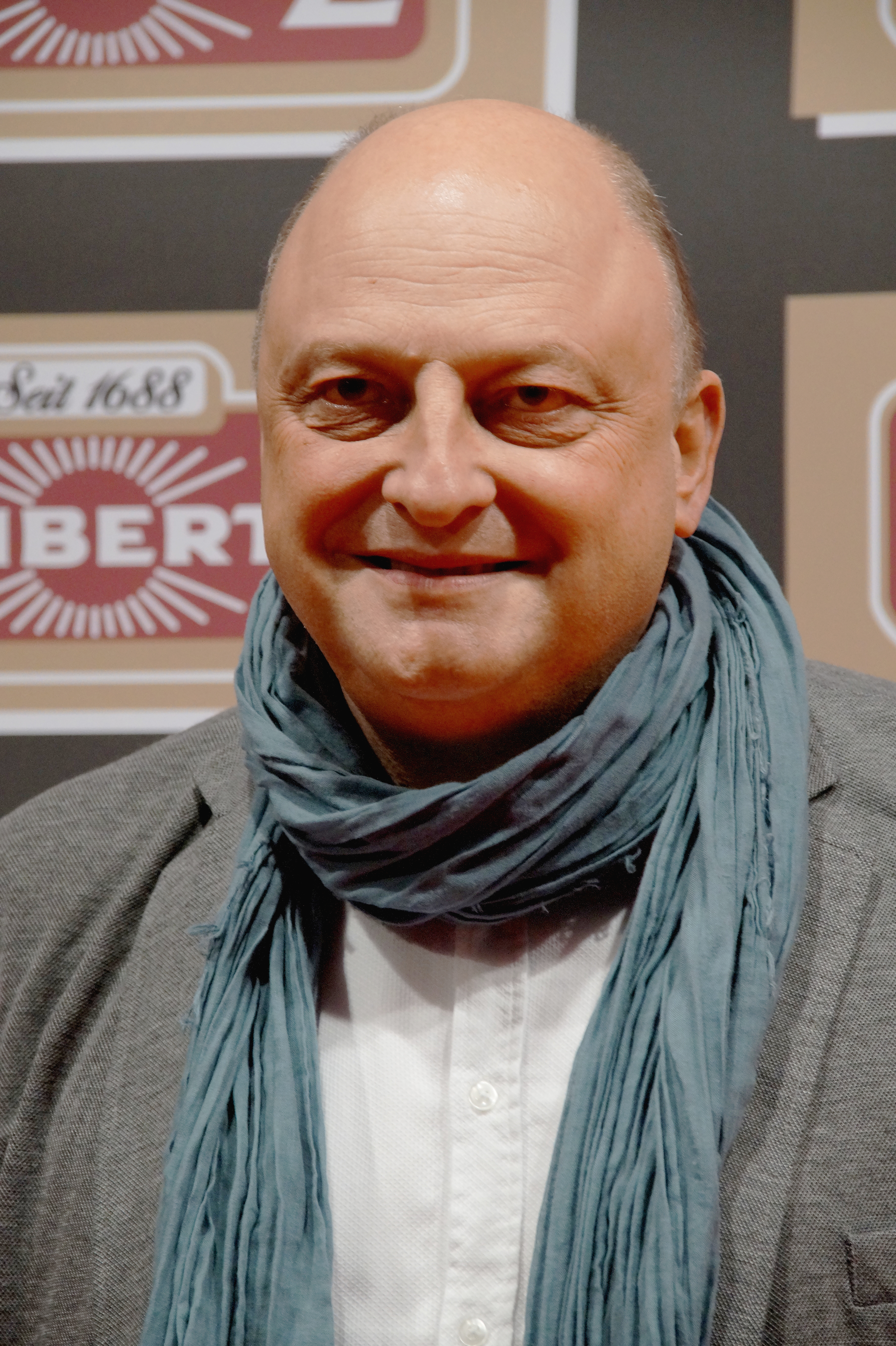

Press Secretary of the President of Germany
- In office 30 June 2010 – 22 December 2011
- President: Christian Wulff

Personal details
- Born: 1961 (age 64–65)
- Party: Christian Democratic Union
- Education: German Sport University Cologne
- Profession: Journalist

Olaf Glaeseker (born 1961 in Oldenburg) is a German political consultant, journalist, publicist, and a close confidant of former President Christian Wulff. He served as the President's press secretary from 30 June 2010 to 22 December 2011. He came under criticism for alleged corruption, and resigned a few weeks before the President himself resigned.

After his military service, he studied at the German Sport University Cologne. As a student, he worked for several regional newspapers, and became political correspondent in Bonn for the Augsburger Allgemeine Zeitung.

In 1999, he was appointed spokesman for the Christian Democratic Union in the state of Lower Saxony. Following Christian Wulff's election as Prime Minister of Lower Saxony, he was appointed government spokesman in 2003, and was raised to become State Secretary in 2008. Glaeseker was credited with a successful public relations campaign for Wulff. Following Wulff's election as President of Germany in 2010, Glaeseker became the presidential press secretary.

In December 2011, Wulff came under criticism, and so did Glaeseker. He was criticized by David McAllister, Wulff's successor as Prime Minister of Lower Saxony. On 22 December, he tendered his resignation.
