= Frank Rennicke =

German singer and far-right activist (born 1964)

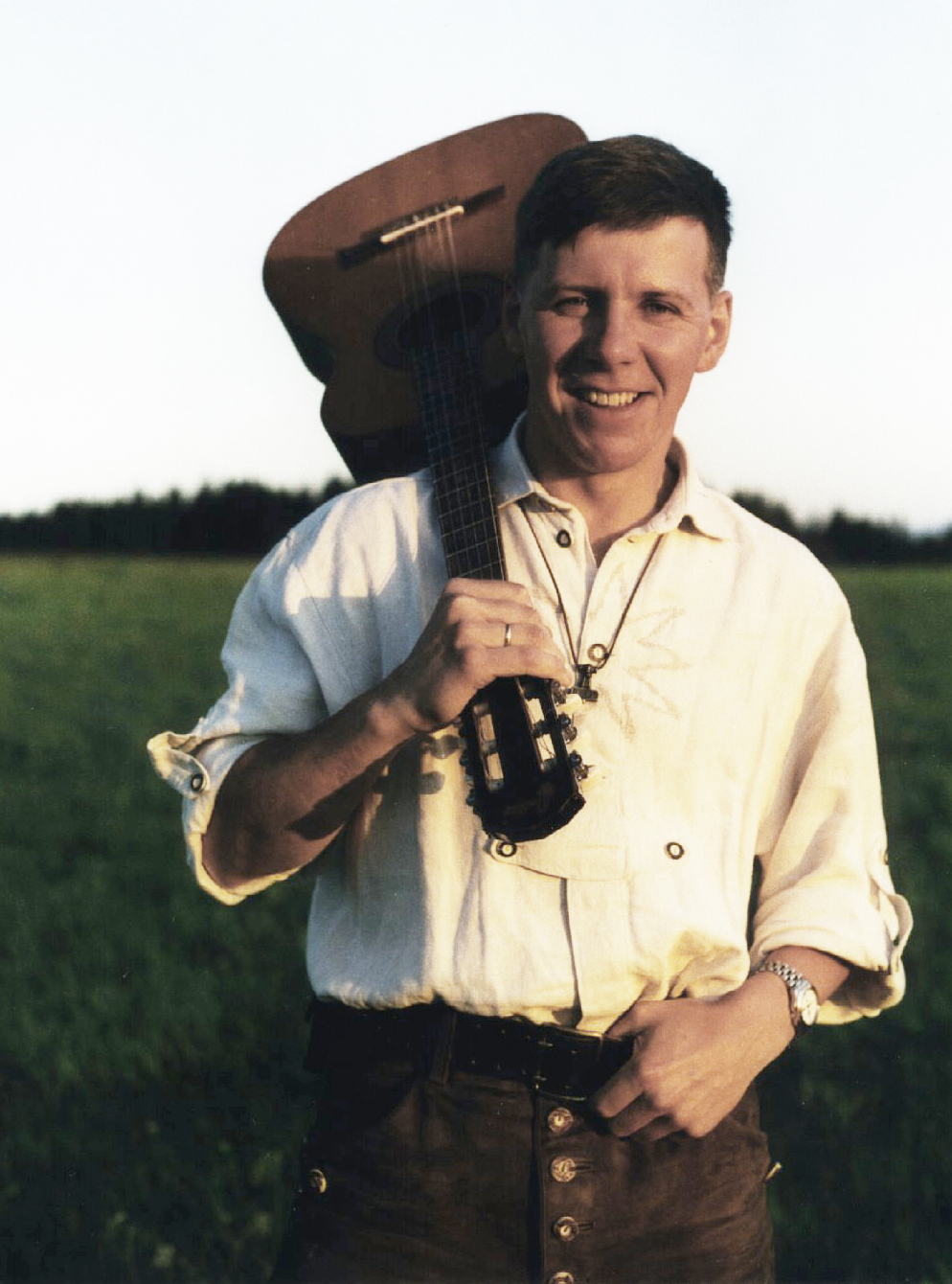
Frank Rennicke

Frank Rennicke (born 18 December 1964 in Braunschweig) is a German songwriter and ballad singer from Braunschweig in Lower Saxony. He is one of the key figures within the far-right scene in Germany, and describes himself as a "national bard".

Rennicke, who sings and plays guitar, is heavily influenced by the musical style of older German left-wing singer-songwriters (Liedermacher) such as Reinhard Mey. He has said that Mey is his role model musically. He is married and has eight children.

== Lyrics and political views ==
His lyrics typically feature far right views. Some of his songs glorify the Wehrmacht, describe the Oder-Neisse line as a "disgraceful border" ("Schandgrenze"), depict Polish people as "contaminators of German soil", and express pride in Germany. Criticism of left-wing groups is also included in his lyrics. Some of his recordings have been categorized by Germany's Bundesprüfstelle für jugendgefährdende Medien (Federal Department for Media Harmful to Young Persons) as having content that may be harmful to young listeners. Rennicke is welcomed at concerts and demonstrations by nationalists, fascists and younger far right skinheads.

Rennicke was a member of the far right Wiking-Jugend (Viking Youth) organisation until it was banned in 1994, after which he became a member of the National Democratic Party of Germany (NPD). In 1996 the far right activist Torsten Lemmer published the book Sänger für Deutschland: Die Biographie des Volkssängers Frank Rennicke (Singer for Germany: The Biography of the Folk Singer Frank Rennicke).

In November 2000, the Böblingen magistrates' court sentenced Rennicke to 10 months' imprisonment for sedition of the people (Volksverhetzung), for which he was granted parole. The Stuttgart state court overruled this decision, and on 15 October 2002, it sentenced Rennicke to 17 months' imprisonment, on eight counts of Volksverhetzung and for contravening the law forbidding the distribution of writings that may be harmful to young people. He was again granted parole.

In 2001, Ingrid Rimland, the wife of the Holocaust denier Ernst Zündel, published a petition to the Canadian government calling for Zündel's release, which was signed by Rennicke and his wife Ute. Rennicke is one of the founding members of the Verein zur Rehabilitierung der wegen Bestreitens des Holocaust Verfolgten (Society for the Rehabilitation of Those persecuted for Refutation of the Holocaust), an organisation originally proposed and founded by the former Red Army Faction lawyer Horst Mahler. Other founding members included Zündel, Gerd Honsik, Germar Rudolf, Manfred Roeder, Wilhelm Stäglich, Robert Faurisson and the widow of Otto Ernst Remer.

In 2009, he was nominated as a candidate for the office of President of Germany by the right-wing parties DVU and NPD but gained only their votes (4 of 1224) and was not considered a serious candidate by the German media. For the 2010 elections on 30 June, which had to be called because of the resignation of president Horst Köhler, Rennicke was again nominated, this time only by the NPD. He received three votes during the first two election rounds and withdrew from the election during the third round.

Rennicke played a leading role in Projekt Schulhof-CD (Project Schoolyard CD), an attempt by the NPD to propagate nationalist ideas among young people.
