= Olof Palme – En levande vilja: Tal och intervjuer =

Olof Palme – En levande vilja: Tal och intervjuer is an audiobook on CD containing speeches and interviews with the former Swedish prime minister Olof Palme.

Sven Ove Hansson and Kjell Larsson made a choice from the archives of SVT, Parliament of Sweden and the Swedish labour movement. The audiobook was released ten years after the assassination of Olof Palme.

== Contents ==
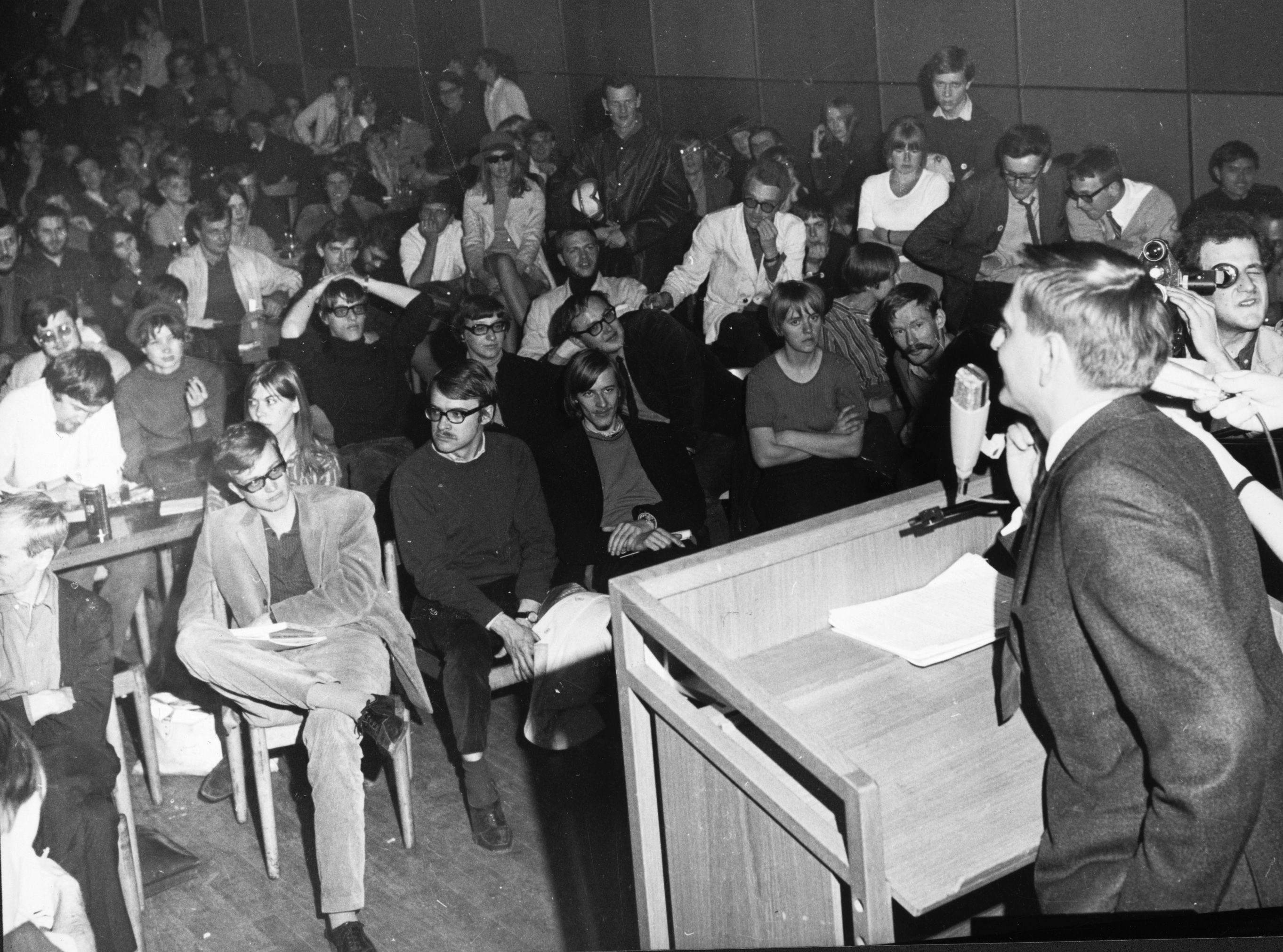
Swedish leftist student uprising – occupation of the Student Union Building in Stockholm. The then minister of education Olof Palme came and tried to persuade the students to embrace democratic values.

1. "Radiointervju efter studentkonferensen 1950" (Palme criticizes the Student International which was heavily influenced by communists. Palme was there to represent the Swedish National Union of Students (Sveriges förenade studentkårer).)
2. "Radiodebatt med Herbert Tingsten 1961" (Tingsten, a political scientist, claimed ideology was dead which Palme didn't agree with)
3. "Första maj-tal i Kramfors 1964" (May Day speech in Kramfors. Most of the speech was a criticism of the apartheid regime in South Africa.)
4. "Radioanförande om invandrarna 1965" (Speech against racism and prejudices.)
5. "På högertrafikdagen 1967" (As minister of communication, Palme was responsible for the process when traffic in Sweden switched from driving on the left-hand side of the road to the right.)
6. "Första maj-tal om Vietnam 1968" (Critique against the Vietnam War)
7. "Nattligt besök på kårhuset 1968" (As minister of education, Olof Palme personally went to visit the occupation of the Student Union Building to explain the importance of democracy and reforms)
8. "Radiointervju om Kårhusockupationen 1968" (Interview on the occupation of the Student Union Building the day after his visit there)
9. "Om ungdomprotesten 1968" (Parliamentary speech about the occupation of the Student Union Building)
10. "Om ockupationen av Tjeckoslovakien 1968" (About the Soviet occupation of Czechoslovakia in 1968)
11. "Intervju av David Frost 1969" (Interview by David Frost, in English)
12. "Valet till partiordförande 1969" (From the party congress when he was elected leader of the Social Democrats)
13. "Om politisk tålamod 1973" (From the TV show "Partiledare på grönbete")
14. "Arbetsmiljö och yttre miljö 1973" (Debate in the parliament on environmental issues)
15. "Folkhemstanken 1971" (Debate in the parliament on visionary issues)
16. "Jultalet om Hanoi 1972" (Criticism of the bombing of Hanoi)
17. "Diktaturens kreatur 1975" (Criticism of the Communist regime in Czechoslovakia)
18. "Satans mördare" (Critic against Fascism in Spain)
19. "Demokrati och människovärde 1975" (Party Congress)
20. "Barnen och framtiden 1975" (Party Congress)
21. "Inledning till valduellen 1976" (Debate against Thorbjörn Fälldin during the election of 1976)
22. "Debatten om statskulden 1977" (Debate with Thorbjörn Fälldin on government debt)
23. "Om TV och folkmöten 1977" (Interview by Hagge Geigert)
24. "Industrisamhällets problem 1979" (Debate in parliament)
25. "Den svenska modellen 1980" (Debate in parliament)
26. "Om SAF och Löntagarfonderna 1981" (Metal Congress)
27. "Därför är jag socialist 1982" (Election debate)
28. "ANC-galan 1985" (Speech at a rock concert in Gothenburg promoting the South African opposition party ANC)
