= Institute for Information on the Crimes of Communism =

- Formation: 2008
- Type: Human rights organization
- Location: Stockholm
- Chair: Camilla Andersson
- Key people: Carl Bildt, Kristian Gerner, Walburga Habsburg Douglas, Mart Laar, Sandra Kalniete, Gunnar Hökmark, Robert Conquest, Stefan Hedlund, Staffan Skott
- Affiliations: Platform of European Memory and Conscience

The Institute for Information on the Crimes of Communism (IICC) (Swedish: Upplysning om kommunismen, UOK) is a Sweden-based non-profit and non-governmental human rights organization, founded in 2008, with the stated purpose of "spreading essential information on the crimes of communism and to promote vigilance against all totalitarian ideologies and antidemocratic movements". The institute is a member organization of the Platform of European Memory and Conscience, an educational project of the European Union bringing together government institutions and NGOs active in research, documentation, awareness raising and education about the crimes of totalitarian regimes.

The IICC publishes information materials and media, surveys, reports, and teaching materials, participates in the public debate, and organizes film screenings, seminars, hearings, media events and exhibitions related to the subject. The IICC cooperates with national institutions, embassies, institutes, NGO:s and organizations in Europe, the United States and Canada.

The board of directors consists of Camilla Andersson (chair), Anders Hjemdahl, Professor Kristian Gerner, Walburga Habsburg Douglas MP, and Mae Liz Orrego Wennick. The institute is largely funded by the Confederation of Swedish Enterprise. The institute received the Templeton Freedom Award in 2009.

Notable honorable members of the IICC and contributors in its publications and activities are current Minister for Foreign Affairs and former Prime Minister of Sweden Carl Bildt, former Prime Minister of Estonia Mart Laar, former Ambassador and EU Commissioner of Latvia Sandra Kalniete, Member of the European Parliament Gunnar Hökmark, professor Robert Conquest, professor of history Kristian Gerner, professor of East European studies Stefan Hedlund, professor of history Klas-Göran Karlsson, author and journalist Staffan Skott, author and journalist Kaa Eneberg, and many others.

In cooperation with the government of Sweden, the organization has carried out remembrance ceremonies on the European Day of Remembrance for Victims of Stalinism and Nazism. Prime Minister Fredrik Reinfeldt, Minister of Education Jan Björklund and EU Ministers Cecilia Malmström and Birgitta Ohlsson have taken part in events hosted by the institute.

The IICC has been involved in raising awareness about the Prague Declaration on European Conscience and Communism both in Sweden and internationally.
