= Gustaf Munthe =

Swedish writer, art historian and art teacher

Gustaf Lorentz Munthe (3 July 1896 – 25 November 1962) was a Swedish writer, art historian and art teacher. He was head of Röhsska Craft Art Museum in Gothenburg from 1924 to 1945 and was also prolific as a writer of the museum's publications. During World War II, Munthe served as head of the M Group of the intelligence agency C-byrån in Gothenburg during World War II, helping the Norwegian resistance movement. He served as chairman and was a member of a number of associations, companies, foundations, guilds and societies.

== Early life ==
Munthe was born on 3 July 1896 in Stockholm, the son of the president of the Court of Chamber Gustaf Fredrik Munthe and his wife Maria (née Wallin). He passed studentexamen in Stockholm in 1915 and received a Bachelor of Arts degree from Stockholm University College in 1917 and a Licentiate of Philosophy degree in 1920.

== Career ==
He conducted art historical surveys of churches in Södermanland and Östergötland provinces from 1919 to 1920 and worked as an assistant in the Art History Department of the Stockholm University College from 1919 to 1921 and as an assistant at Nationalmuseum from 1921 to 1924. Munthe was secretary of the Stockholm Beauty Council in 1924 and worked as curator and head of the Röhsska Craft Art Museum in Gothenburg from 1924 to 1945. He was art history teacher at the seminar of the Handarbetsvännerna ("Friends of the Artisanry") from 1921 to 1924 and a member of the International Jury at the Paris Exhibition in 1925. Munthe was a member of the committee for the Chicago World's Fair in 1933 and was District Governor for the Rotary movement in Sweden 1935-1936 and 1940-1941. He was also a member of the Travellers Club, Sällskapet Gnistan ("Gnistan Society") and Sällskapet Idun ("Idun Society"). In 1938, Munthe became a member of the commission for the Swedish Delaware Exhibition in America.

During World War II, Munthe was engaged in the Finland Committee and traveled to America to raise money. Together with, among others, Folke Bernadotte and Elsa Brändström, they got the United States Congress to grant a loan of $30 million to Finland. When Germany invaded Denmark and Norway, he underwent an officer training, where he first started working for the Swedish Security Service and then in the military intelligence service where he led the so-called M-gruppen ("M Group") at C-byrån in Gothenburg. The M Group's operations focused on helping the Norwegian resistance movement. The M Group was named after the museum director of the Röhsska Craft Art Museum, Gustaf Munthe himself, and the base for the operations was at the premises of his museum at Vasagatan in Gothenburg. During the end of the war, Munthe enrolled in the Norwegian Army. He was captain in a group of Norwegian and Swedish soldiers and radio technicians who brought a convoy of four military vehicles across the border to Norway. According to Munthe, the convoy was loaded with "heavy weapons" and ammunition. The group's purpose was to build a radio receiver at Holmenkollen outside Oslo. They blasted the Norwegian roadblocks and then came to Ørje Customs Station. When they finally reached Oslo, the Germans had surrendered and Munthe witnessed how the Norwegian traitor Vidkun Quisling was jailed at the police station in Oslo. Munthe would later in life write the book Tennsoldaten : minnen från krigsåren ("The Tin Soldier : memories of the war years") (1960) about his wartime experiences.

Munthe was CEO of Svenska turisttrafikförbundet ("Swedish Tourist Traffic Association") from 1944 to 1951 and after that he headed the Children's Day in Stockholm from 1952 to 1955. He was appointed captain of the Bohuslän Regiment's (I 17) reserve in 1948 and owned the publishing house Svenska turistförlaget from 1951. In 1957 he obtained a Doctor of Philosophy degree from Stockholm University College. Munthe was also a member, board member and chairman of a number of associations, companies, foundations, guilds and societies; board member of the Swedish Exhibition and Congress Centre 1928-1951, of the Stockholm Exhibition in 1930, of Svenska slöjdföreningen (Swedish Sloyd Association) 1931-1943 and 1944-1946 (chairman of the union section), of the Sweden–America Foundation's Zorn Scholarship 1929-1930, of the Gothenburg City Theatre 1935-1945, of the AB Gbgssystemet 1938-1945, of the Svenska hemslöjdsföreningens riksförbund ("Swedish National Home Sloyd Association") 1945-1950 and of the Drottningholm Theatre Museum from 1945.; member of the Swedish Handicraft Association 1945-1947, of the Svenska orientsällskapet ("Swedish Orient Society") from 1950, of the Svensk-italienska sällskapet ("Swedish-Italian Society") from 1952, of the Konsthantverkarnas gille ("Artisans' Guild") 1952-1958, of the Foundation Natur & Kultur 1952, of the Statens kommitté för social upplysning ("State Committee for Social Enlightenment") in 1946 and of the Tourist Investigation at the Ministry of Trade in 1948; chairman of the Humanist Department of Stockholm University College Student Union from 1918-1920, of the Stockholm Federation of Student Unions in 1924, of the Föreningen Göteborgs konsthantverkare ("Association of Gothenburg's Artisans") 1929-1945, of the Stockholm University College Student Union 1923-1924, of the Svensk-Jugoslaviska Sällskapet i Göteborg ("Swedish-Yugoslav Society in Gothenburg") from 1939, of the Swedish Tourist Association's Gothenburg Board 1938-1943 and of the Föreningen Konstfliten-Bohusslöjd ("Handicraft-Bohuslän Sloyd Association") 1940-1944.; vice chairman of the Svensk-Pakistanska vänskapsföreningen ("Swedish-Pakistani Friendship Association") from 1953.

== Personal life ==
In 1922, Munthe married Inger Dyberg (born 1898), the daughter of the Justice of the Supreme Court of Sweden Vilhelm Dyberg and Gulla Åberg. In 1945 he married Birgitta Ribbing (born 1914), the daughter of Peder Ribbing and Agnete (née Sporon).

== Death ==
Munthe died of a heart disease on 25 November 1962 in Stockholm. He was buried at Solna Cemetery in Stockholm.

== Awards and decorations ==
Munthe's awards:

=== Swedish ===
- (Sweden) King Gustaf V's Jubilee Commemorative Medal (1948)
- (Sweden) Knight of the Order of the Polar Star
- Minnesmedaljen över kolonien Nya Sverige i Amerika ("Commemorative Medal for the colony New Sweden in America")
- (Sweden) Lingiadens jubileumsguldmedalj ("Ligiad Commemorative Gold Medal")

=== Foreign ===
- (Italy) Commander of the Order of Merit of the Italian Republic
- Knight 1st Class of the Order of the White Rose of Finland
- (Italy) 2nd Class of the Order of the Star of Italian Solidarity
- (Finland) Officer of the Order of the White Lion
- (Norway) King Haakon VII Freedom Cross
- (Norway) Norwegian Crowning Medal
- (France) Officer of the French Ordre du Mérite touristique

== Honours ==
- Member of the Royal Society of Sciences and Letters in Gothenburg (1941)
