= Carl Bildt =

Swedish politician and diplomat (born 1949)

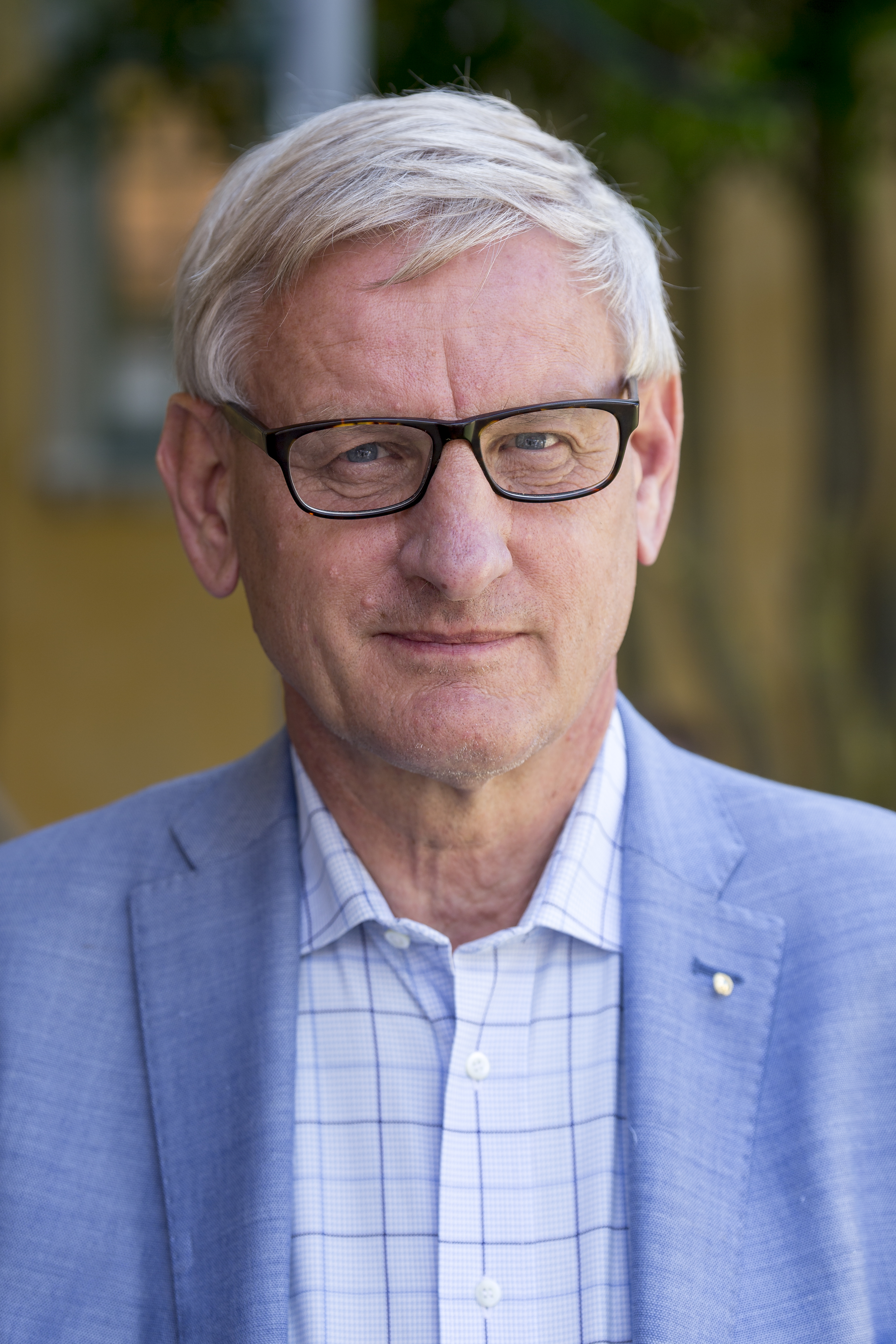
- Bildt in 2016

Prime Minister of Sweden
- In office 4 October 1991 – 7 October 1994
- Monarch: Carl XVI Gustaf
- Deputy: Bengt Westerberg
- Preceded by: Ingvar Carlsson
- Succeeded by: Ingvar Carlsson

Minister for Foreign Affairs
- In office 6 October 2006 – 3 October 2014
- Prime Minister: Fredrik Reinfeldt
- Preceded by: Jan Eliasson
- Succeeded by: Margot Wallström

High Representative for Bosnia and Herzegovina
- In office 14 December 1995 – 18 June 1997
- Preceded by: Office established
- Succeeded by: Carlos Westendorp

Leader of the Opposition
- In office 7 October 1994 – 4 September 1999
- Monarch: Carl XVI Gustaf
- Prime Minister: Ingvar Carlsson; Göran Persson
- Preceded by: Ingvar Carlsson
- Succeeded by: Bo Lundgren
- In office 23 August 1986 – 4 October 1991
- Monarch: Carl XVI Gustaf
- Prime Minister: Ingvar Carlsson
- Preceded by: Ulf Adelsohn
- Succeeded by: Ingvar Carlsson

Leader of the Moderate Party
- In office 23 August 1986 – 4 September 1999
- Preceded by: Ulf Adelsohn
- Succeeded by: Bo Lundgren

Member of the Riksdag for Stockholm Municipality
- In office 1979–2001

Personal details
- Born: Nils Daniel Carl Bildt; 15 July 1949 (age 77) Halmstad, Sweden
- Party: Moderate
- Spouses: Kerstin Zetterberg (m. 1974; div. 1975) Mia Bohman (m. 1984; div. 1997) Anna Maria Corazza (m. 1998)
- Children: 3
- Relatives: Gillis Bildt (great-great grandfather); Bildt family
- Education: Stockholm University
- Cabinet: Bildt's Cabinet

Military service
- Allegiance: Sweden
- Branch/service: Swedish Army

Nils Daniel Carl Bildt (born 15 July 1949) is a Swedish politician and diplomat who served as Prime Minister of Sweden from 1991 to 1994 and as leader of the Moderate Party (M) from 1986 to 1999. He served twice as Leader of the Opposition (1986–1991 and 1994–1999). He later held office as Foreign Minister under Fredrik Reinfeldt, serving from 2006 to 2014. He represented Stockholm Municipality as a Member of the Riksdag from 1979 until 2001. As a member of the noble Bildt family, he is a great-great grandson of former prime minister Gillis Bildt.

Bildt had been noted internationally as a mediator in the Yugoslav Wars, serving as the European Union's Special Envoy to the former Yugoslavia from June 1995, co-chairman of the Dayton Peace Conference in November 1995 and High Representative for Bosnia and Herzegovina from December 1995 to June 1997, immediately after the Bosnian War. From 1999 to 2001, he served as the United Nations Secretary-General's Special Envoy for the Balkans. Since 2021, Bildt also has been the World Health Organization's Special Envoy for the Access to COVID-19 Tools Accelerator (ACT Accelerator).

== Early life and education ==
Bildt was born on 15 July 1949 in Halmstad, Halland, to an old Danish-Norwegian-Swedish noble family, the Bildt family, traditionally domiciled in Bohuslän. His grandfather's grandfather, Gillis Bildt, was a Conservative politician and diplomat, long-time Ambassador to the German Empire and Prime Minister of Sweden 1888–1889, mainly remembered for his protectionist trade policies.

Bildt's father Daniel Bildt (1920–2010) was a major in the reserves of the now defunct Halland Regiment and a bureau director in the now defunct Civil Defense Board's Education Bureau. Daniel Bildt married Kerstin Andersson-Alwå in 1947. Carl Bildt's brother, Nils, was born in 1952.

Bildt was married to Kerstin Zetterberg from 1974 to 1975; to Mia Bohman (daughter of former Moderate party leader and Minister of Economy, Gösta Bohman) from 1984 to 1997; and, since 1998, to Anna Maria Corazza. Bildt has three children: Gunnel and Nils from his second marriage and Gustaf from his third marriage. He has a common sister-in-law, Marita Bildt, with Swedish Prime Minister Ulf Kristersson.

Bildt attended Stockholm University.

== Early career ==
In May 1968, Bildt opposed the occupation of the Student Union Building by leftist political forces and co-founded the Borgerliga Studenter – Opposition '68 group which went on to win the Student Union elections in Stockholm for a number of years. He served as chairman of the FMSF Confederation of Swedish Conservative and Liberal Students, a centre-right student organisation, in the early 1970s, and also chaired the European Democrat Students, bringing together like-minded centre-right student organisations from across Europe.

When the non-socialist formed government in 1976, Bildt served as the head of the Policy Coordinating Office in the Ministry of Economic Affairs and close collaborator to the party leader and Minister of Economy Gösta Bohman. Bildt became a Member of Parliament in 1979, although he served instead as State Secretary for Policy Coordination in the reformed non-socialist government after that election.

As an MP in the early eighties, he became noted as an incisive and combative debater on foreign affairs. He was a member of the Submarine Defence Commission investigating the 1982 incursions of foreign submarines in the Stockholm archipelago and naval base areas, and often found himself pitted against prime minister Olof Palme. Bildt was elected leader of the Moderate Party in 1986, succeeding Ulf Adelsohn.

In 1991, the Social Democrats were defeated by a four-party coalition led by Bildt's Moderate Party.

== Prime minister ==
Bildt with President George H. W. Bush, on 20 February 1992

On 4 October 1991, Bildt became the first conservative prime minister in Sweden in 61 years, leading a four-party coalition government. The policies of his government aimed at giving Sweden a "new start" in the middle of a rapidly mounting economic crisis caused by a speculation bubble in housing, focusing on privatising and de-regulating the economy in order to improve the conditions for businesses.

Long a champion of European integration and Sweden's participation in this, negotiating membership in the European Union was a priority for the Bildt premiership. The preceding Social Democratic government had, as part of an emergency economic crisis package in the autumn of 1990, done a sudden U-turn, abandoned its previous opposition and in the summer of 1991 submitted a formal application for membership in the EU.

Benefiting also from his close links with German Chancellor Helmut Kohl, Bildt was able to initiate and conclude membership negotiations with the EU in record time, signing the Treaty of Accession at the EU summit in Corfu on 23 June 1994. The accession was supported by a referendum in November, and Sweden entered the EU as full member on 1 January 1995, thus fulfilling a key part of the platform of the Bildt government.

By that time his governing coalition had lost its majority in the September 1994 elections, in spite of his Moderate party making slight gains.

The economic program of the government was focused primarily on a series of structural reforms aiming at improving competitiveness and improving growth. Economic reforms were enacted, including voucher schools, liberalizing markets for telecommunications and energy, privatizing publicly owned companies and health care, contributing to substantially liberalizing the Swedish economy.

These reforms were highly controversial at the time, and the government also had to deal with a rapid increase in unemployment as well as public deficits during 1991 and 1992. The period was marked by a severe economic crisis. These problems were reinforced by the economic crisis in other European countries and the crisis within the European Exchange Rate Mechanism in 1992. As a result, Sweden in November 1992 was forced to abandon its policy of a fixed exchange rate and allow the Swedish crown to float freely. As part of the effort to handle the economic crisis, the government was able to conclude an agreement with the Social Democratic opposition on some of its expenditure-cutting measures.

By 1994 the economy was registering strong growth, and the deficits were declining, although unemployment was still at levels higher than in 1991.

Prior to becoming prime minister, Bildt had been severely anti-Soviet Union and a strong supporter of the three Baltic nations, and during his period as PM devoted considerable efforts to trying to assist the three newly-independent Baltic states in handling their immediate challenges in the form of the withdrawal of ex-Soviet forces and strategic installations, as well as deciding on sensitive issues of citizenship. In this he worked closely together with the leaders of the three countries as well as with the Russian foreign minister Andrei Kozyrev.

His government also had to handle a large increase in refugee flows from primarily the war in Bosnia, defending a liberal approach against the anti-immigration New Democracy party that had entered parliament in 1991.

Bildt was an early champion of the Internet and information technologies. He led the first IT Commission in 1994, and in that year also had the first exchange of emails between two heads of government with US president Bill Clinton, sending Clinton the following email:

Dear Bill,

Apart from testing this connection on the global Internet system, I want to congratulate you on your decision to end the trade embargo on Vietnam. I am planning to go to Vietnam in April and will certainly use the occasion to take up the question of the MIA's. From the Swedish side we have tried to be helpful on this issue in the past, and we will continue to use the contacts we might have.

Sweden is—as you know—one of the leading countries in the world in the field of telecommunications, and it is only appropriate that we should be among the first to use the Internet also for political contacts and communications around the globe.

Yours,

CARL

In the same year, Bildt established and chaired an IT Commission to introduce digital initiatives in Sweden while at the same time the government donated 1 billion SEK to create the Knowledge Foundation.

In 1992, he had the reform of private schools under contract and the abolition of the school map adopted, reforms that favored the privatization of education.

The government's effectiveness was sometimes hampered by in-fighting, most memorably over the construction of the Øresund Bridge, which led to the departure of the leader of the Centre Party Olof Johansson from the government, paving the way for the government to take the decision to approve the construction of the link.

Bildt continued to serve as leader of the Moderate party – and thus of the opposition – until 1999, when he was succeeded as party leader by Bo Lundgren.

== Balkan conflict ==
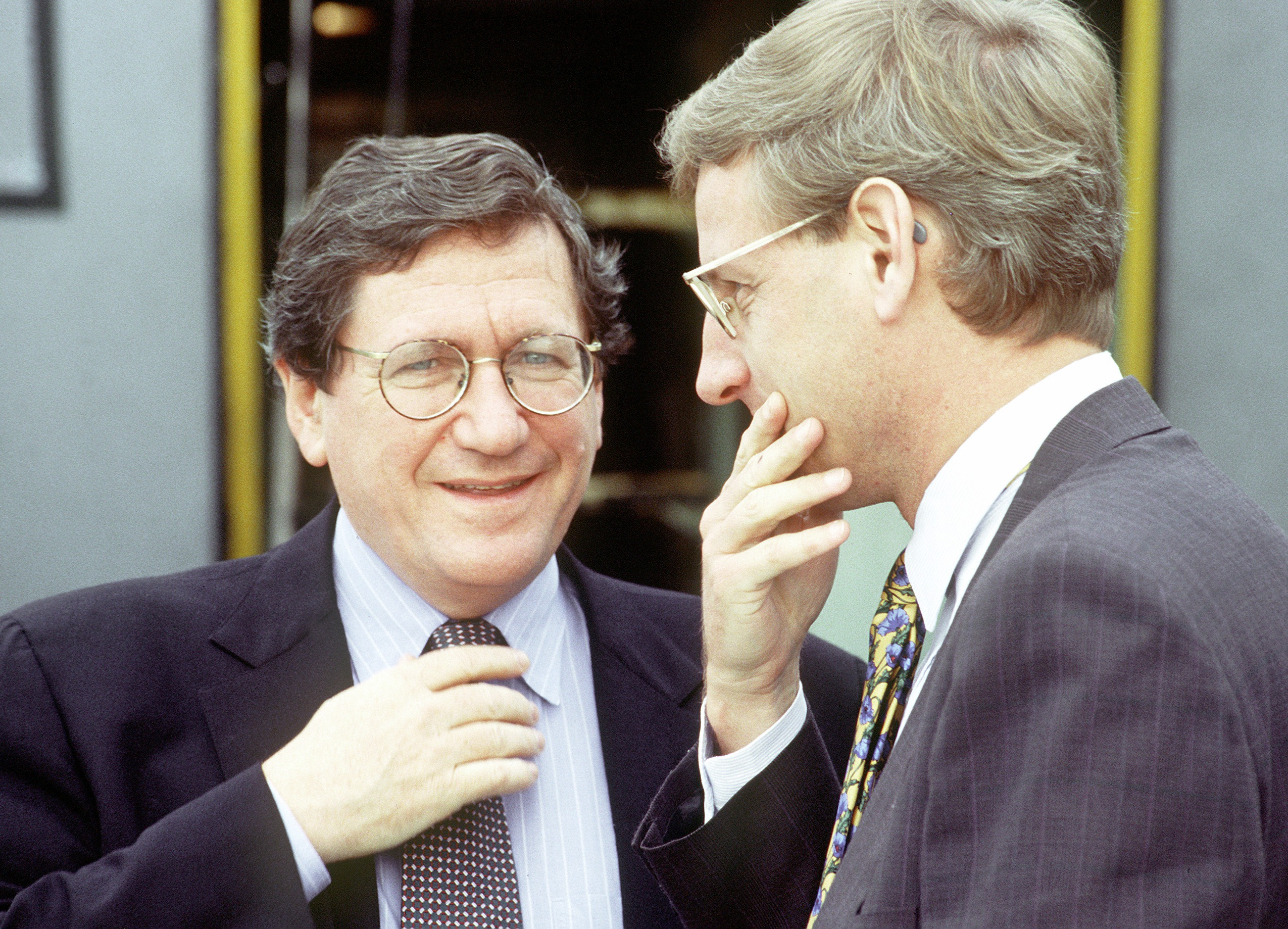
Bildt (right) and Richard Holbrooke before peace talks in Sarajevo, Bosnia-Herzegovina, in October 1995

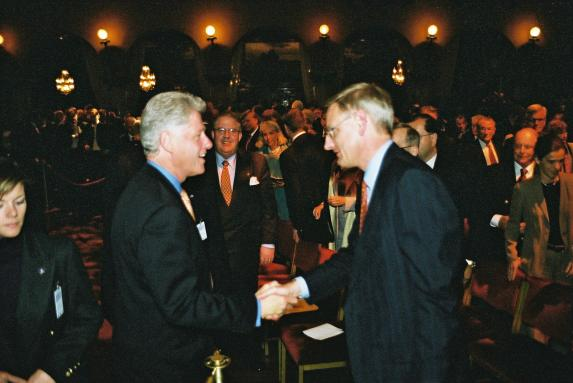
Bildt meeting former US president Bill Clinton at Grand Hotel in Stockholm on 15 May 2001

After his term as prime minister, Bildt was active as a mediator in the Balkans conflict, serving as the European Union Special Envoy to Former Yugoslavia from June 1995, co-chairman of the Dayton Peace Conference that led to the Dayton Peace Accords in November 1995, and High Representative for Bosnia and Herzegovina from December 1995 to June 1997 immediately after the Bosnian War. From 1999 to 2001, he served as the United Nations Secretary General's Special Envoy for the Balkans.

Kosovo unilaterally declared its independence from Serbia on 17 February 2008, without the approval of the UN Security Council, and Sweden recognised it on 4 March 2008. On 8 March 2008, Bildt became the first foreign minister to officially visit Kosovo after it declared its independence.

== Minister for Foreign Affairs ==
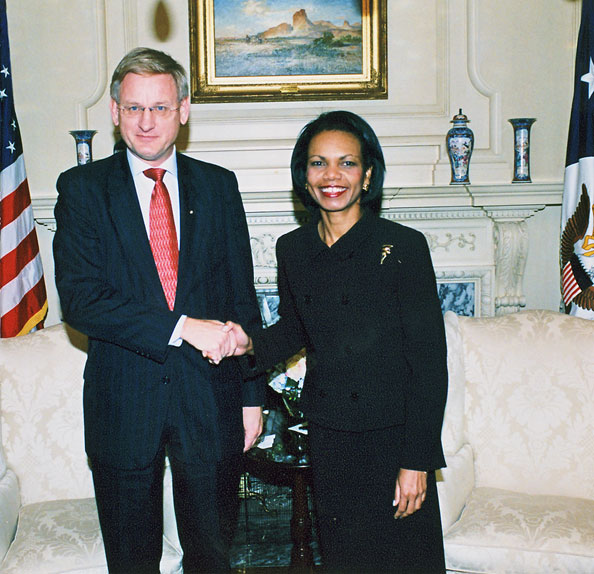
Bildt with U.S. secretary of state Condoleezza Rice in Washington, D.C., on 24 October 2006.

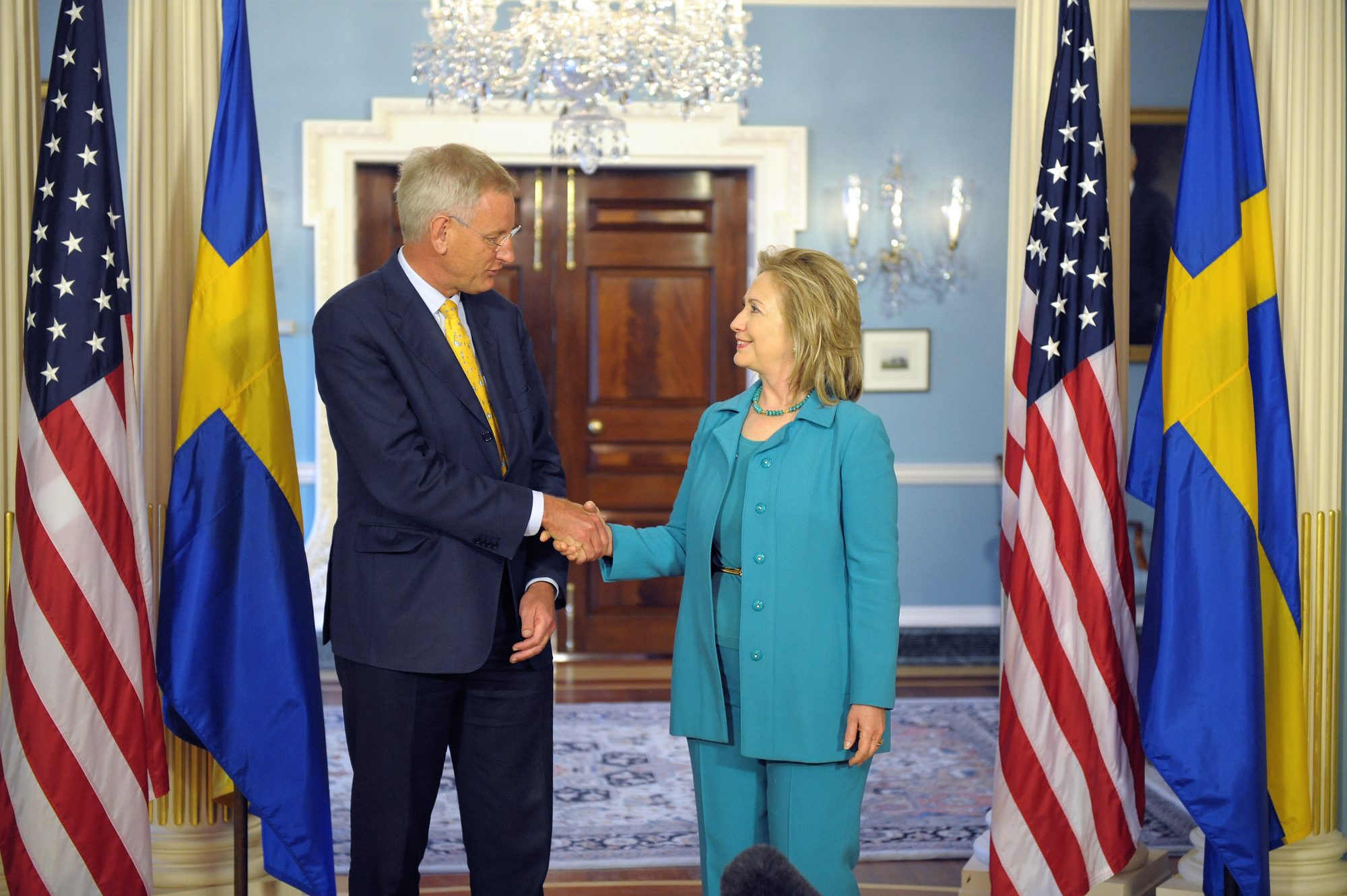
Bildt with U.S. secretary of state Hillary Clinton in Washington, D.C., on 29 April 2011

On 6 October 2006, Bildt was appointed as minister of foreign affairs in the newly formed cabinet of Fredrik Reinfeldt. This was seen by many as a surprising move. Not only had Bildt already served both as prime minister and as leader of the Moderate Party, but he and Reinfeldt had previous antipathy. He retained this post following the 2010 general election.

During his time in office, Bildt was widely credited with steering efforts to set up the EU's Eastern Partnership in 2008. When Sweden held the rotating presidency of the Council of the European Union in 2009, he chaired the sessions of the EU's General Affairs and External Relations Council. For several years, he was widely seen as a candidate to become the first High Representative of the Union for Foreign Affairs and Security Policy under the new rules established by the Treaty of Lisbon; instead, the role went to Catherine Ashton.

Early in his tenor he was criticised for his close relationship with Russia, and for favoring Russian influence in the EU.

Bildt later supported the 2011 military intervention in Libya. On 29 March, the government approved the deployment of JAS 39 Gripen multirole jet fighters to Libya to enforce the no-fly zone.

Following the 2014 European elections, the Financial Times and other news media considered Bildt as a potential candidate to succeed Ashton as High Representative; this time, the position went to Federica Mogherini.

Bildt lost his post after the 2014 general election, and moved on to become a board member of the International Crisis Group.

=== Turkey ===
Bildt was as foreign minister in 2007 an active supporter for Turkey to join the EU. He called Istanbul a "true center of European history" and called Kemal Atatürk "undoubtedly the most significant European revolutionary of the last century" in 2004. Bildt's campaign for Turkey's EU membership was controversial in central Europe.

EU membership of Turkey was hindered by its government not recognizing Cyprus, an EU member along with reservations from the president of France, Nicolas Sarkozy.

In November 2014 Bildt was criticised for having written an opinion piece in Dagens industri newspaper where Recep Tayyip Erdoğan was described as being "on the right track" despite the persecution of Kurds and political opponents and jailed journalists in Turkey.

=== South Ossetian conflict ===
After the 2008 South Ossetia war, Bildt wrote on his blog that the Russian rationale for its intervention, concern for the welfare of its expatriates in the Near Abroad, had similarities with the rationale for the annexation of Sudetenland. Bildt called South Ossetian independence "a joke", and said it would be supported only by a "miserable" lot of countries.

== Activities ==
=== Work in private sector ===
After leaving his position as leader of the Moderate Party in 1999, other than engaging in international issues, Bildt took positions in the private sector and positions with international think tanks. His positions in think tanks included serving as the first non-US member on the Board of Trustees of the RAND Corporation in Santa Monica, California, and on the Advisory Board of the Centre for European Reform in London. He was a member of the board of the European Policy Centre in Brussels, the International Institute for Strategic Studies in London, and the International Advisory Board of the Council on Foreign Affairs in New York.

Bildt served as non-executive director of the Baltimore-based US assets management company Legg Mason, Inc. He served as chairman of the board of Teleopti and chairman of the public affairs consultancy Kreab AB, and board member of the IT consultancy HiQ AB. He was chairman of Nordic Venture Network, which brought Nordic high-tech VC firms together in an informal network.

In 2000, Bildt joined the Lundin Group's board of directors, a company with oil interests in Ethiopia and Sudan – the seven years with the Lundin Group that followed made Bildt a wealthy man.

From March to November 2000, Bildt was part of an independent panel – together with Jean Peyrelevade and Lothar Späth – to advise the European Space Agency's Director General Antonio Rodotà on the organization's future.

In 2002, Bildt joined the board of directors of Vostok Nafta, a financial company primarily with holdings in Gazprom.

He left his positions on all these boards upon becoming foreign minister in October 2006. Under public scrutiny, he sold his stock holdings in Vostok Nafta. Criticism mounted as he assumed public office given the potential conflict of interest with his previous business dealings. He was briefly investigated for bribery as a result of his role with Vostok Nafta.

=== Bosnian war mediator criticisms ===
EU member states including United Kingdom, France, and Germany, celebrated his mediation of the conflict and the aftermath. Over time, his role in the conflict has been interpreted in both a negative and positive light.

Bildt opposed any military intervention and criticised the former British prime minister Margaret Thatcher in 1993 for calling NATO to intervene against the Bosnian Serb forces, which led to The Sunday Times describing Bildt and other EU leaders as "robotic political pygmies" and their acceptance of the ongoing genocide as "shameful".

Following Bildt's appointment as the EU special envoy to Yugoslavia, Tom Warrick from the Coalition for International Justice described Bildt as "dangerously misinformed about his own job description" and largely ignorant about the region. The New York Times criticised Bildt for a nonchalant attitude towards the Srebrenica genocide when over 8,000 Bosniaks were killed, and described him as being burdened with a reputation for accepting Bosnian Serb claims of good behavior at face value and overlooking evidence of atrocities against civilians.

=== Middle East ===
Bildt has been questioned for his role as a member of the International Advisory Council of the Committee for the Liberation of Iraq, a group with ties to the Bush administration pushing for an invasion of Iraq in 2003.

On 8 April 2008, during his visit in Israel and the Palestinian Authority, Bildt gave an interview to Swedish state radio, where he responded to a question on whether it would be possible to strike a peace deal without the involvement of the Palestinian group Hamas, which at the time was under an international boycott. He responded that the Palestinian Fatah-backed government could deal with Israel, in the same way that it was possible for the Israeli government to make peace with Fatah over the objections by the Israeli prime minister Benjamin Netanyahu, who, similar to Hamas, opposed a two-state deal. Israeli officials issued strongly worded condemnations against Bildt's statement, claiming it was "horrible and stupid," an example of "chutzpah," and a "complete ignorance of the Middle East." They objected to their belief Bildt was comparing Hamas and Netanyahu equally.

In 2012, Bildt said he saw no problem with exporting Swedish weapons to Saudi Arabia. According to Bildt, "Would the situation in the world be better if they had bought French manufactured ones instead?" Bildt called friendly Saudi Arabia as a "family business" and said that he sees Saudi Prince Turki bin Faisal Al Saud "quite regularly". In 2015, Bildt criticised Sweden's foreign minister Margot Wallström for damaging Saudi-Swedish relations. Wallström tweeted criticism of Saudi Arabia's flogging of Saudi blogger and activist Raif Badawi.

=== Annexation of Crimea ===
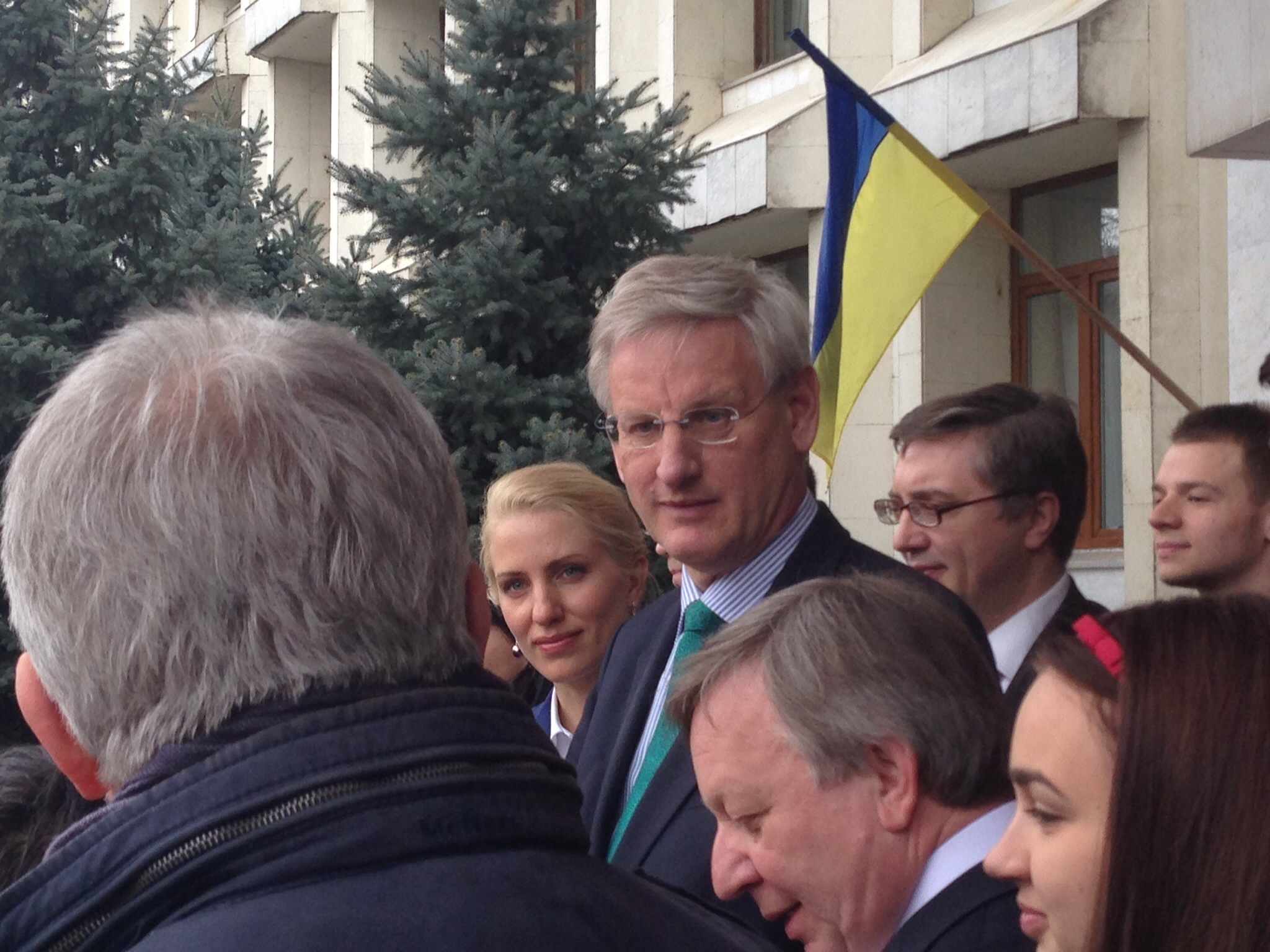
Bildt visiting the Ukrainian capital, Kyiv, 11 April 2014

Map of the EU 28 in 2013: Eastern Partnership.

Bildt, together with Polish foreign minister Radosław Sikorski, was one of the main architects of the 2013 Eastern policy of the EU.

During Euromaidan, Carl Bildt was criticised in Swedish media for ignoring and downplaying the issues with the Ukrainian Svoboda party. Johan Croneman at Dagens Nyheter also condemned Bildt for pushing Prime Minister Fredrik Reinfeldt to rephrase himself after having expressed understanding of the Russians' concerns about the situation.

In a public message on Twitter, Bildt compared Viktor Yanukovych to Vidkun Quisling, writing that he was "sitting on foreign soil begging a foreign army to give his country to him". This has been described as "undiplomatic" by Christer Jönsson, professor in political science at the Lund University. Norwegian politician Anniken Huitfeldt also criticised Bildt's statement, saying that it showed "ignorance of history" and that it "does not contribute to solving the conflict". Torsten Kälvemark from Aftonbladet criticised Bildt's statement, writing in the newspaper:

"Our Foreign Minister is ignorant, because it was actually Norway's legal head of state, Haakon VII, that during the war sat on foreign soil and hoped that he would with help from the British get back his country".

The culture editorial of the Aftonbladet newspaper where Torsten Kälvemark works has repeatedly been criticised since for being a tool of Russian propaganda in Sweden.Stefan Hedlund, professor at Uppsala University, stated that "Carl Bildt's threatening rhetoric should in this context be regarded as extremely destructive," in an article about the Russo-Ukrainian war. Hedlund also suggested that Bildt should take a "time-out", and that progress can only be made through dialogue with Russia.

In a radio interview with channel SR P1 on 15 March, Bildt stated that he considers the Crimean referendum illegal, and "invalid, no matter which way people vote". He continued his refusal to answer questions about Svoboda, saying that he "won't describe what that party is". His overall comment on the new regime in Kyiv was that it was a fair, reasonable and democratic government and that he does not want to play along with Russian propaganda.

In early 2015, a study made at the Swedish Defence Research Agency stated that Bildt had been a target of information warfare and that he was "regularly smeared in Russian state-controlled media". The reason was described to be Bildt's involvement in the Eastern Partnership program and that the project was perceived as a threat by the Russian government.

In September 2015, Bildt visited Kyiv, where he argued that the EU should provide more financial support to Ukraine.

== Internet activities ==
Bildt was an early pioneer among politicians of using the Internet for communicating. On 4 February 1994, he sent an email message to US president Bill Clinton, which was the first publicly known electronic message sent between two heads of government. In the message he praised Clinton's decision to end the trade embargo on Vietnam. In the same year, he also started a weekly electronic newsletter which was active until 2005. He is an active blogger, starting his first blog in February 2005. His current blog, started in January 2007, is one of the most widely read political blogs in Sweden.

On 30 May 2007, Bildt officially opened a "Swedish embassy" in the virtual world Second Life. The embassy, called "Second House of Sweden", is a virtual replica of House of Sweden, the Swedish embassy building in Washington, D.C. During Bildt's time as foreign minister, the Ministry of Foreign Affairs has opened a channel on YouTube which has been active since early 2008. He maintains a personal Twitter feed in English with approximately 780,000 subscribed followers. By 2013, an annual Burson Marsteller survey showed him as the best connected world leader. As of 2014, Bildt has served as chair of the Global Commission on Internet Governance.

== Life after politics ==
Bildt served as chair of the Global Commission on Internet Governance, a joint project of the Centre for International Governance Innovation and Chatham House, from 2014 that concluded its two-year work and produced its report in June 2016. On 19 December 2014 Bildt was announced as a distinguished fellow of the Centre for International Governance Innovation.

In mid-May 2015, Bildt was appointed to Ukraine's International Advisory Council on Reforms. The group consisting of several foreign advisors to President Petro Poroshenko, aims to improve security and economy in the country which has been ravaged by armed conflict in its Eastern part. On 14 May 2015, Bildt was also appointed as an advisor to Russian-controlled investment group LetterOne. In 2016, he joined international law firm Covington as a Senior Policy Advisor in the firm's global Public Policy and Government Affairs practice.

Bildt also writes monthly columns for international syndication organization Project Syndicate.

On 9 April 2021, Bildt was criticized for saying the Swedish defence forces were stronger than Norway and Denmark while commemorating the anniversary of the German occupation of Norway.

Following the 2022 Swedish general election and the election of Ulf Kristersson as Prime Minister Bildt revealed Kristersson had approached him offering to once again make Bildt Minister for Foreign Affairs in his cabinet. Bildt declined the offer, citing he does not like to do the same thing twice.

=== Corporate boards ===
- Planet Labs, Member of the European Advisory Board (since 2026)

=== Non-profit organizations ===
- Center for European Policy Analysis (CEPA), Member of the International Leadership Council (since 2022)
- Global Leadership Foundation, Member (since 2016)
- Historians without Borders, Member of the Coordinating Committee (since 2016)
- Atlantic Council, Member of the International Advisory Board
- Berggruen Institute, Member of the Berggruen Network
- Centre for European Reform (CER), Member of the Advisory Board
- Club de Madrid, Member
- European Council on Foreign Relations (ECFR), Co-Chair
- Friends of Europe, Member of the Board of Trustees
- GLOBSEC, Member of the International Advisory Board
- International Crisis Group (ICG), Member of the Board of Trustees
- International Institute for Strategic Studies (IISS), Member of the Council
- Middle East Investment Initiative (MEII), Member of the Board of Directors
- Munich Security Conference (MSC), Member of the Advisory Council
- RAND Corporation, Member of the Board of Trustees
- Stockholm Resilience Centre (SRC), Member of the International Advisory Board
- Trilateral Commission, Deputy Chair of the European Group
- Wallenberg Foundations, Senior Adviser
- Wilfried Martens Centre for European Studies, Member of the Honorary Board
- Yalta European Strategy (YES), Member of the Board

== Distinctions ==
- (Sweden) H. M. The King's Medal,12th size on chain (2003)
- (France) Legion of Honour, Commander
- (United Kingdom) Order of St Michael and St George, Honorary Knight Commander
- Order of Merit of the Federal Republic of Germany, Grand Cross
- (Luxembourg) Order of the Oak Crown, Grand Cross
- (Greece) Order of the Phoenix, Grand Cross
- (Italy) Order of Merit, Grand Cross
- (Poland) Order of Merit, Grand Cross
- (Lithuania) Order of Grand Duke Gediminas, Grand Cross
- (Latvia) Order of the Three Stars, Commander Grand Cross
- (Estonia) Order of the Cross of Terra Mariana, Grand Cross
- (Norway) Royal Order of Merit, Grand Cross (1 July 1992)
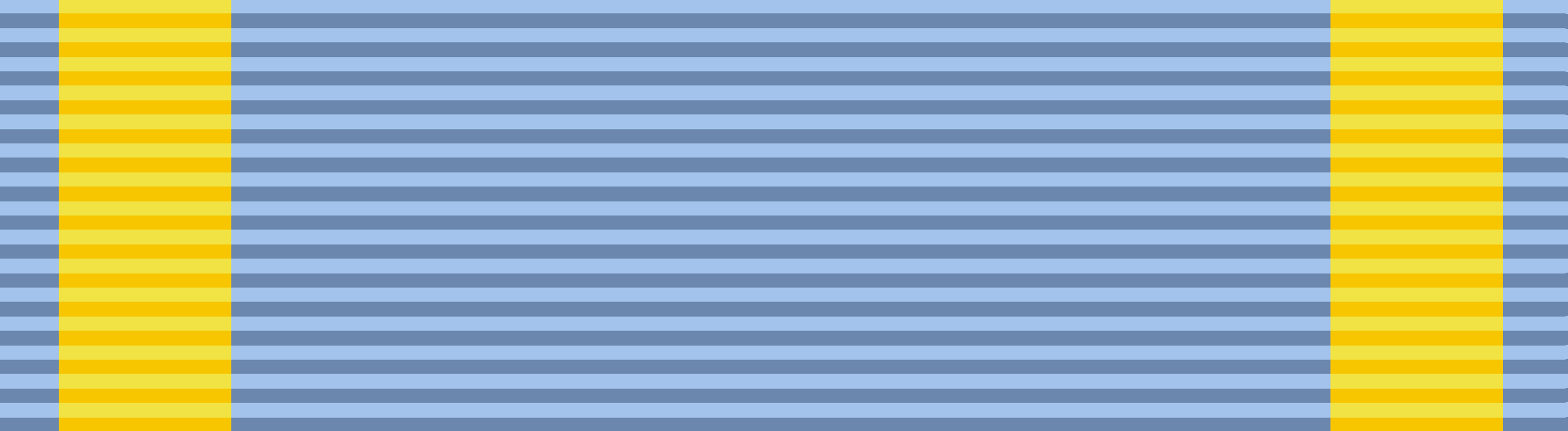
- (Ukraine) Order of Prince Yaroslav the Wise, Second Class
- (Romania) : Order of Faithful Service, Grand Cross (2008)
- Bildt has an honorary doctorate from the University of St Andrews.
- Bildt is an honorary member of the Institute for Information on the Crimes of Communism, and contributes to its publications.
- Knight of Freedom Award (2015)

== Bibliography ==
- Bildt, Carl (1991). Hallänning, svensk, europé (in Swedish). Stockholm: Bonnier. ISBN 91-34-51204-7.
- Bildt, Carl (1994). Den enda vägen (in Swedish). Stockholm: Moderata samlingspartiet. ISBN 91-85816-09-4.
- Bildt, Carl (1997). Uppdrag fred (in Swedish). Stockholm: Norstedt. ISBN 91-1-300324-0.
- Bildt, Carl. (Stockholm 1998) Peace Journey. The Struggle for Peace in Bosnia. (in English) London, Weidenfeld & Nicolson. ISBN 0297841319
- Bildt, Carl (2019). Den nya oredans tid (in Swedish). Stockholm: Albert Bonniers Förlag. ISBN 9789100186265.

Party political offices
Preceded by Ulf Adelsohn	Leader of the Moderate Party; 1986–1999	Succeeded by Bo Lundgren
Political offices
Preceded by Ulf Adelsohn	Leader of the Opposition; 1986–1991	Succeeded by Ingvar Carlsson
Preceded by Ingvar Carlsson	Prime Minister of Sweden; 1991–1994	Succeeded by Ingvar Carlsson
Preceded by Ingvar Carlsson	Leader of the Opposition; 1994–1999	Succeeded by Bo Lundgren
Preceded by Jan Eliasson	Minister for Foreign Affairs; 2006–2014	Succeeded by Margot Wallström
Diplomatic posts
New office	High Representative for Bosnia and Herzegovina; 1995–1997	Succeeded by Carlos Westendorp
