= Corazza =

Corazza is an Italian surname. Notable people with the surname include:

- Anna Maria Corazza Bildt (born 1963), Italian-Swedish politician
- Simone Corazza (born 1991), Italian footballer
- Vince Corazza (born 1972), Canadian-born American actor
