= Student unions at Lund University =

Student unions at Lund University organize students on a faculty and department levels and monitors education quality and fairness at the university. The umbrella organization Lund University Student Union Association (Lunds universitets studentkårer; LUS) represents the unions nationally (such as in the Swedish National Union of Students), and is in turn responsible for the collective representation of the university's more than 40,000 students in relation to the university, government and others.

== Purpose ==
Student unions monitor and participate in the planning of education provided at their respective institutions, usually divided into a block covering educational issues (quality of education, focus, pedagogy, content, coordination, etc.) and a block covering social issues related to studies (study infrastructure—housing, healthcare, library and computer resources, working environment, etc.).

Other common areas of responsibility within the unions concern labor market issues, internationalization, and gender equality and diversity issues. In other parts of the country, a great deal of energy is devoted to organising social events for students, often in the form of pub and party activities, but also sports activities, student media and reception activities for new students. In Lund and Uppsala, this is formally considered to be the responsibility of the nations - as is their main focus - although the unions do spend significant resources on arranging their own balls and initiation periods for new students. The guilds of TLTH are very much an alternative to the student nations for engineering students in terms of the social activities that they provide. Before the university was given responsibility for student health, many unions were responsible for student healthcare.

== History ==
Lund students were historically all organized under the banner of the Lund Students' Union (Lunds Studentkår; LS), which was officially founded in 1867. By the 1960s, the union had become a party-political organization ruled by indirect democracy. In 1984, the engineering students seceded from the union, and formed their own union, TLTH. Ten years later, it was decided that the unions should be organized on a faculty-level. By 1996, the LS had become obsolete and was ultimately liquidated as an organization in 1998. The succeeding LUS would form the new cooperation organ of the unions, and would also take over the ceremonial functions of the former LS - such as the Rektorsuppvaktning ceremony on May 1st.

Prior to 2010, it was obligatory to be a member of a student union, and where applicable, a student nation. The so-called Kårobligatoriet was abolished in the summer of that year, which led to the creation of the Studentlund cooperation.

== List ==
There are nine student unions at Lund University that are supposed to represent and support students on the faculty and department levels. Oftentimes, the unions are organized into sections or guilds to better support students studying at larger departments, with some sections and guilds representing students at the programme-level.

Name	Acronym	Faculty/Area of studies	Formation year	Member count (2024)
Law Students' Union Juridiska Föreningen	JF	Faculty of Law	1884	1,486
LundaEkonomerna	LE	School of Economics and Management (LUSEM)	1961	3,687
Doctoral Students' Union Lunds Doktorandkår	LDK	Doctoral students across all faculties, except LTH.	1996	505
Science Student Union Lunds naturvetarkår	LUNA	Faculty of Science	1995	1,825
Social Sciences Student Union Samhällsvetarkåren vid Lunds universitet	SAM	Faculty of Social Sciences	1995	4,965
Teknologkåren vid Lunds Tekniska Högskola, consisting of 11 guilds (sektioner): A Guild (architecture and industrial design) A-sektionen; D Guild (computer science, information and communication technology, virtual reality) D-sektionen; Doctoral Student Guild (DOKT); E Guild (electrical engineering, medicine and technology programme, wireless communications programme) E-sektionen; F Guild (engineering physics, engineering mathematics, engineering nanoscience) F-sektionen; K Guild (chemical engineering, biotechnology, food technology and nutrition, pharmaceutical tech.) K-sektionen; I Guild (industrial economics, logistics and supply chain management) I-sektionen; ING Guild (engineering and technical foundation year students studying at the Helsingborg campus) Ingenjörssektionen inom TLTH; M/Machine Guild (mechanical engineering, technical design, material and production engineering) Maskinsektionen; V Guild (civil engineering, land surveying, fire engineering, risk management) V-sektionen; W Guild (ecosystems engineering, risk, security and crisis management) W-sektionen	TLTH	LTH (Faculty of Engineering) students	1984	~7,500 (2023)
Corpus Medicum, consisting of two sections: Medicine Students' Union Medicinska föreningen (MF); Health Sciences Students' Union Vårdvetenskapliga Studentföreningen (VÅVS)	CM	Faculty of Medicine	MF in 1894	2,389
Student Union at the Faculty of Arts in Malmö Studentkåren vid Konstnärliga fakulteten i Malmö	SKFM	Faculty of Fine and Performing Arts		287
Humanitites and Theology Student Union Humanistiska och teologiska studentkåren	HTS	Joint Faculties of Humanities and Theology	2010	3,710
