= Kristian Gerner =

Swedish historian and author (1942–2026)

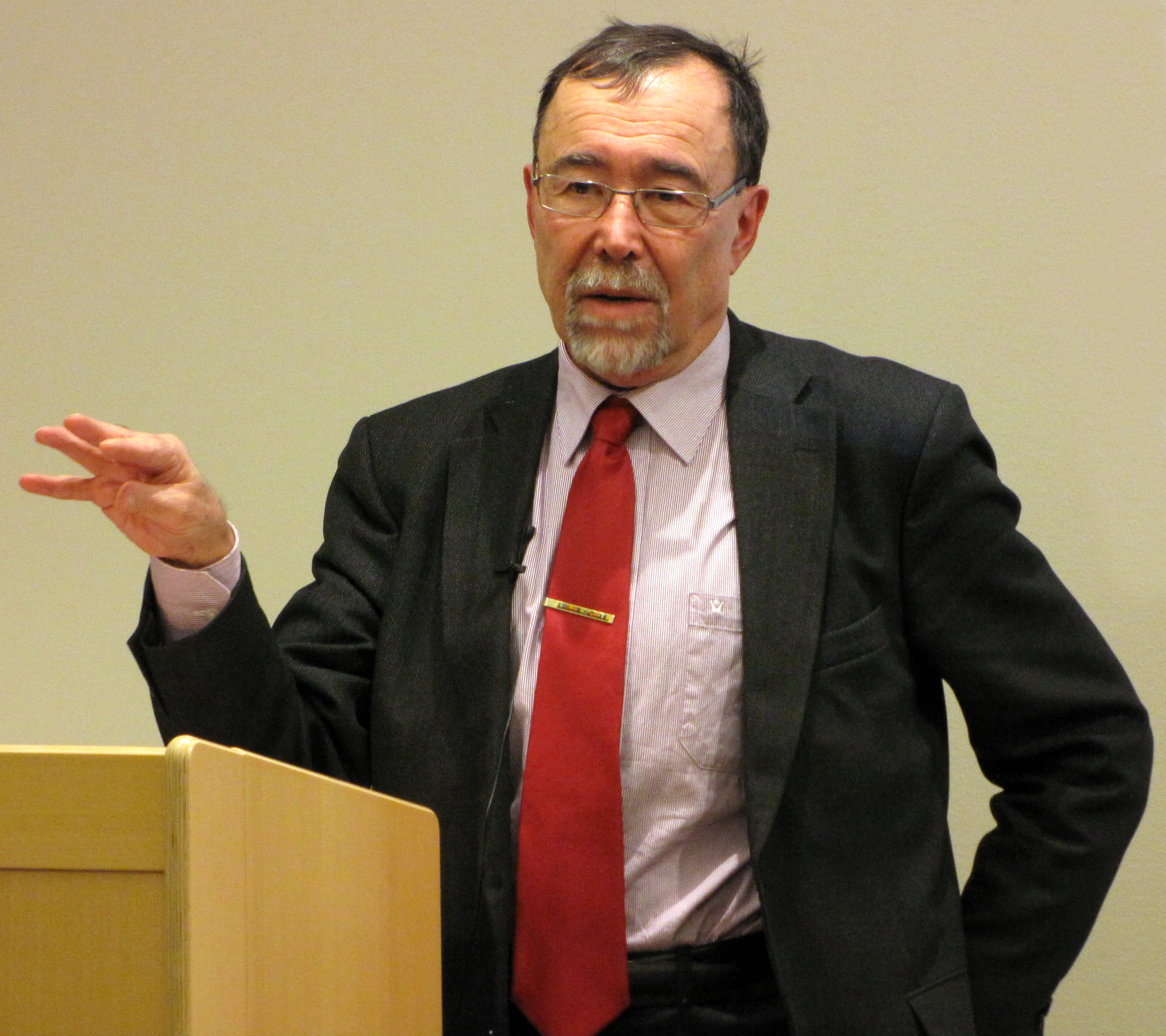
Gerner in 2012

Kristian Gerner (Swedish pronunciation: [krɪˈɧanː ɡæːɳɛr]; 25 May 1942 – 2 April 2026) was a Swedish historian, author and expert on Eastern Europe who was Professor of History at Lund University (from 2002). From 1994 to 2002, he was Professor of Eastern European History and Culture, also at Uppsala University. Gerner earned his doctorate at Lund in 1984.

Gerner was, until his death, a board member of the Institute for Information on the Crimes of Communism.

On 4 December 2013, in the Swedish newspaper Aftonbladet, he commented on a clip broadcast on Russian state television where a Swedish children's programme was used as an example, saying that he recognized the arguments from Russian propaganda, calling them sexually hostile and homophobic, and also saying that they represented a totally heinous atmosphere pursued by the Putin leadership in tight coalition with the Russian Orthodox church.

Gerner died on 2 April 2026, at the age of 83.

== Publications ==
- Framtidsinriktad samhällsforskning i Sovjetunionen, with Ingmar Oldberg, 1972
- Konflikten i Teschen 1918-1920, 1974
- Planhushållning och miljöproblem. Sovjetisk debatt om natur och samhälle 1960-1976, with Lars Lundgren, Stockholm, Liber 1978
- Arvet från det förflutna. Sovjet på tröskeln till 80-talet, Stockholm, Liber 1978
- Ideology and Rationality in the Soviet Model. A Legacy for Gorbachev, with Stefan Hedlund, London, Routledge 1989
- Svårt att vara ryss. På väg mot postsovjetismen, Lund, Signum, 1989
- Centraleuropas återkomst, Stockholm, Norstedts 1991, 1992
- The Baltic States and the End of the Soviet Union, with Stefan Hedlund, London, Routledge, 1993
- Hjärnridån. Det europeiska projektet och det gåtfulla Ryssland, with Stefan Hedlund and Niclas Sundström, Stockholm, Fischer 1995
- Centraleuropas historia, Stockholm, Natur och Kultur, 1997, 2004
- Nordens medelhav. Östersjön som historia, myt och projekt, with Anders Hammarlund and Klas-Göran Karlsson, Stockholm, Natur och Kultur, 2002
- Ryssland: en europeisk civilisationshistoria, Lund, Historiska media, 2011
