= Isabella Hökmark =

Swedish politician (born 1962)

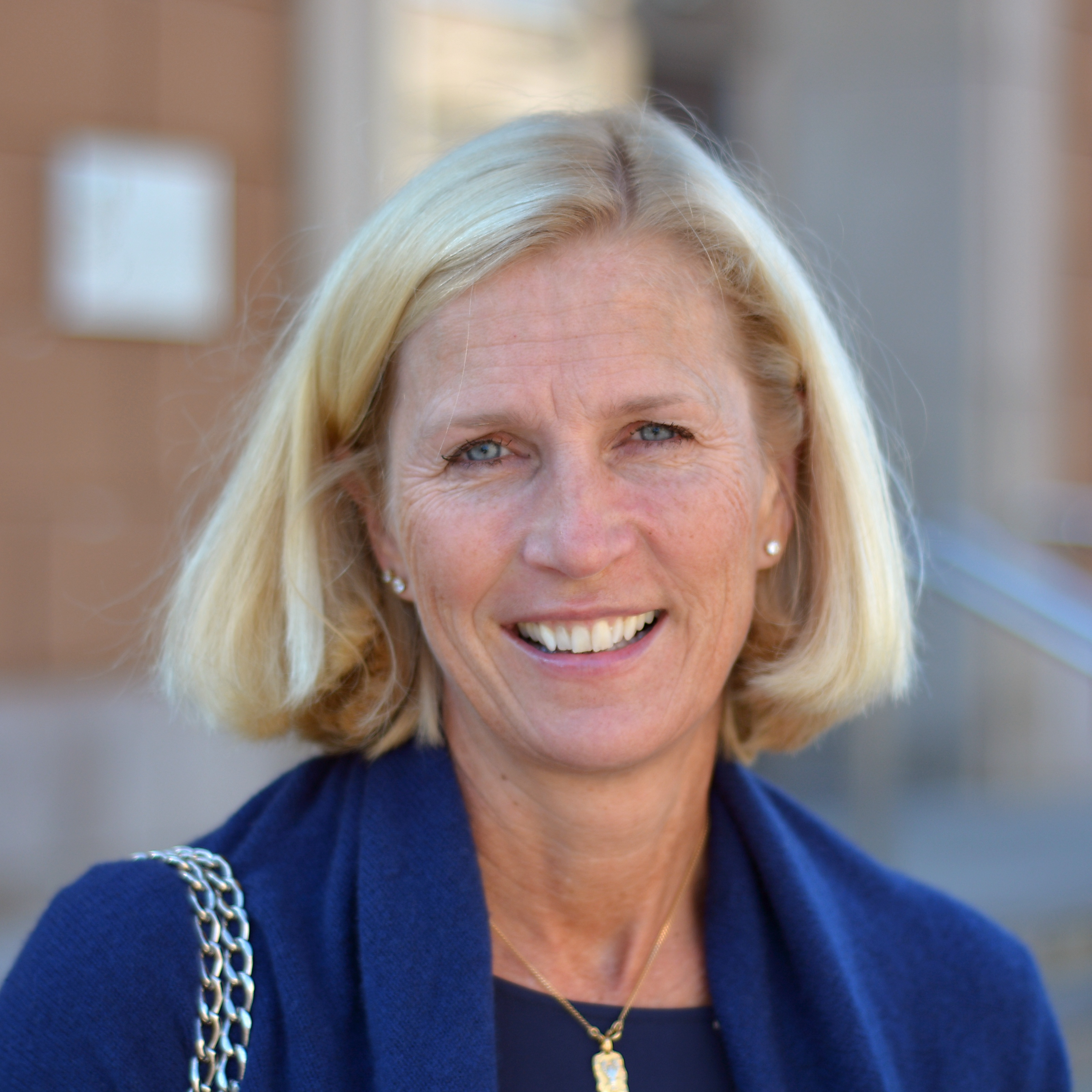

Member of the Riksdag
- In office 2016–2014, 2015–2018

Personal details
- Born: 22 June 1962 (age 63)
- Party: Moderate Party
- Spouse: Gunnar Hökmark

Kerstin Isabella Hökmark (born Lehander, previously Jernbeck, on 22 June 1962 in Nyköping) is a Swedish politician of the Moderate Party. She was a member of the Riksdag from 2006 to 2014 and from 2015 to 2018.

She is married to Swedish MEP Gunnar Hökmark.
