= Gunnar Hökmark =

Swedish politician (born 1952)

Gunnar Hökmark MEP
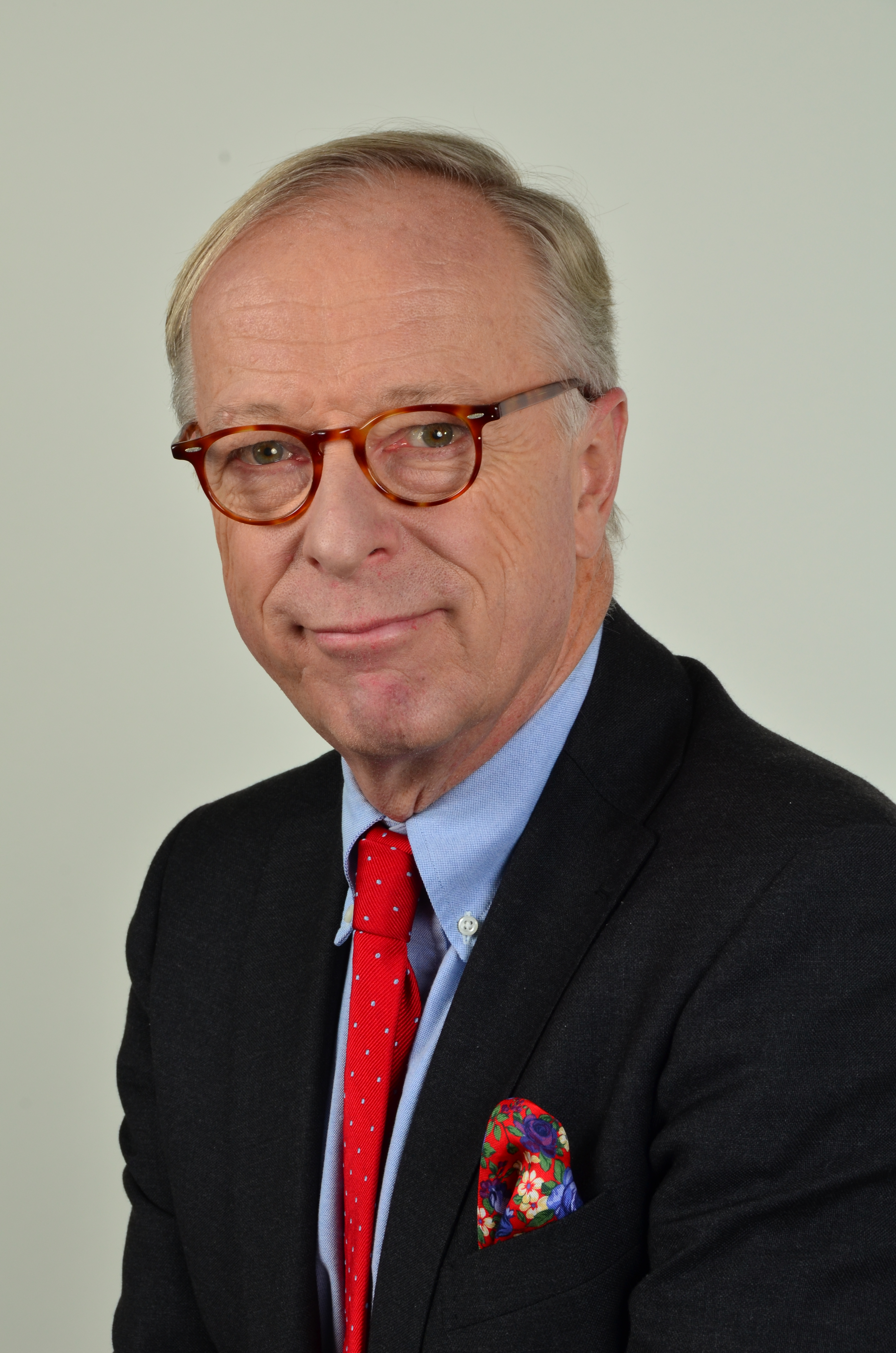
- Gunnar Hökmark in February 2014

Member of the European Parliament
- In office 2004–2019
- Constituency: Sweden

Secretary of the Moderate Party
- In office 4 October 1991 – 4 September 1999
- Leader: Carl Bildt
- Preceded by: Per Unckel
- Succeeded by: Johnny Magnusson

Member of the Riksdag
- In office 19 September 1982 – 13 June 2004
- Constituency: Stockholm County

Personal details
- Born: Anders Gunnar Hökmark; 19 September 1952 (age 74) Ystad, Sweden
- Party: Swedish; Moderate Party; EU; European People's Party
- Spouse(s): Agnetha Hökmark (m. 1979; her death 2009); Isabella Lehander (m. 2014)
- Children: 3
- Education: Lund University

Video-Introduction

Anders Gunnar Hökmark (born 19 September 1952) is a Swedish politician who served as a Member of the European Parliament (MEP) from 2004 until 2019. He is member of the Moderate Party, part of the European People's Party. He previously served as Secretary of the Moderate Party from 1991 to 1999 and Member of the Riksdag (MP) for Stockholm County from 1982 to 2004.

== Early life and education ==
Hökmark was born on 19 September 1952 in Ystad, Sweden, the son of major general Gösta Hökmark and his wife Anne-Marie (née Forneborg). Hökmark finished a B.A. in business administration and economics at Lund University in 1975 and joined Swedish Unilever in 1976 as trainee and became product manager in 1977. After his military education, parallel with his university studies, he became an officer in the Swedish Armoured Troops of the Swedish Army and is today a captain in the reserve.

== Political career ==
In 1979 Hökmark was elected Chairman of the Moderate Youth League, a position he held till 1984. From 1981 to 1983 he was Chairman of the Democratic Youth Community of Europe (DEMYC).

=== Member of the Swedish Parliament, 1982–2004 ===
Hökmark was elected to the Swedish Parliament in the 1982 elections. He served in the Swedish Parliament from 1982 to 2004 as a representative for the Stockholm region. In the Parliament he was the spokesman on privacy policy, energy policy and economic affairs, as well as President of the Standing Committee on Constitutional Affairs.

In 1986 he became managing director of Timbro Idea and developed the think tank division of Timbro, which is today the leading think tank in Sweden. During the time at Timbro he headed the think tank and research activities and took also the initiative to and launched the City University in 1988.

In 1989 Hökmark started the so-called Monday movement, a popular movement supporting the independence of the Baltic States that spread all over Sweden, which today is manifested by a monument at the main meeting place in Stockholm, Norrmalmstorg. He is awarded with Estonian, Latvian and Lithuanian orders. In 2013 he was also awarded with the Georgian Order of Excellence, for his support for freedom and democracy in the county.

He was the Secretary-General of the Moderate Party between 1991 and 2000, during which time he led a number of election campaigns as well as the referendum campaign about Sweden's membership in the European Union. He was responsible for the process of the Moderate Party joining the European People's Party as full member.

In 2000 Hökmark left his office as Secretary General and took the initiative to establish the think-tank Institute of Reform, where he was managing director, with a clear agenda to prepare policies for a shift of government after the general elections 2002, policies that could not be launched as the Social Democrats stayed in power.

In 2002 Hökmark became President of the Committee on Constitutional Affairs in the Swedish Parliament, a position he held until being elected Member of the European Parliament in 2004.

=== Member of the European Parliament, 2004–2019 ===
In parliament, Hökmark served as Vice Chairman of the EPP Group from 2007 until 2014. EPP is the largest group in the European Parliament with 265 members. He was the leader of the Swedish delegation to the EPP and active in the Committee of Economic and Monetary Affairs and the Committee of Industry, Energy and Research. He was also a member of the Special Committee on the Financial, Economic and Social Crisis as well as the Special Committee on the Policy Challenges and Budgetary Resources for a Sustainable European Union after 2013 and the Special committee on financial crimes, tax evasion and tax avoidance.

From 2012 to 2014, Hökmark led the Parliament's work on the Bank Recovery and Resolution Directive (BRRD).

From 2014 to 2019, he was the parliament's rapporteur on the banking structure reform.

From 2016 to 2019, Hökmark led the Parliament's work on the Insolvency Hierarchy, the introduction of Total Loss Absorbing Capacity (TLAC) into European legislation and the revision of the Bank Recovery and Resolution Directive as well as the Single Resolution Mechanism Regulation (SRMR)

As active in the Committee on Industry, Research and Energy, Hökmark negotiated, among others, the proposal to establish EU:s first multi-annual Radio Spectrum Policy Programme (2012) which laid the ground for developing more mobile broadband capacities, which was instrumental for European competitiveness and for the phasing out of roaming fees in EU. He was the rapporteur for a number of reports and legislation aiming for a more rapid deployment of broadband, higher capacities and speeds and the direction to a Gigabit society. As the EPP-group rapporteur he managed to deregulate the rules for participation in the 7th framework programme for research and innovation (2006).

As rapporteur for the EPP-group, he was able to achieve a majority supporting increased competition in the electricity market and rules for separation between producers and distributors, a principle that also was adopted in the gas market legislation. He also represented the EPP group in the energy markets legislative process and the establishment of the governance for the energy union and climate action (2018)

In addition to his committee assignments, Hökmark was the chairman of the Parliament's delegation to the EU-Croatia Joint Parliamentary Committee and active in the delegation to the Euronest Parliamentary Assembly. He was Chairman of the European Friends of Israel and the Sweden-Israel Friendship Association. He was also a member of the Reconciliation of European Histories Group and affiliated with the Institute for Information on the Crimes of Communism.

In 2007, Hökmark narrowly lost against Joseph Daul after three rounds of voting in the election of the chairman of the centre-right European People's Party Group.

== Political positions ==
Hökmark co-sponsored the European Parliament resolution of 2 April 2009 on European conscience and totalitarianism.

Gunnar Hökmark is still working for the implementation of a European Magnitsky act and in 2015, news media reported that Hökmark was included in a Russian blacklist of prominent people from the European Union who are not allowed to enter the country.

Hökmark is also a member of the European Leadership Network (ELN)

== Personal life ==
In 1979, Hökmark married Agnetha Jönsson (1951–2009), the daughter of Albert Jönsson and Else (née Mattsson). In 2014, he married Isabella Lehander.

== Bibliography ==
  - (1981) A New Deal
  - (1982) When Might Goes Before Right
  - (1983) Defending Freedom
  - (1984) A Freer Sweden
  - (1986) The Good Sweden (with Odd Eiken)
  - (2005) Values of Freedom - A European Challenge
  - (2007) The World Is Not Awaiting
  - (2014) En ny deal - om uppbrott för Europas framtid
  - (2015) The European agenda
  - (2016) Sandkorn och snöstormar – ett starkare Europa i en hotfull värld
  - (2017) Den nya upplysningen
  - (2019) Ett friare Europa – många steg som kräver mer
  - (2019) For freedom since ’52- läsebok för frihet

Party political offices
Preceded by Per Unckel	Secretary of the Moderate Party; 1991–1999	Succeeded by Johnny Magnusson
