= Takeover of Vanha =

1968 political protest at the University of Helsinki, Finland

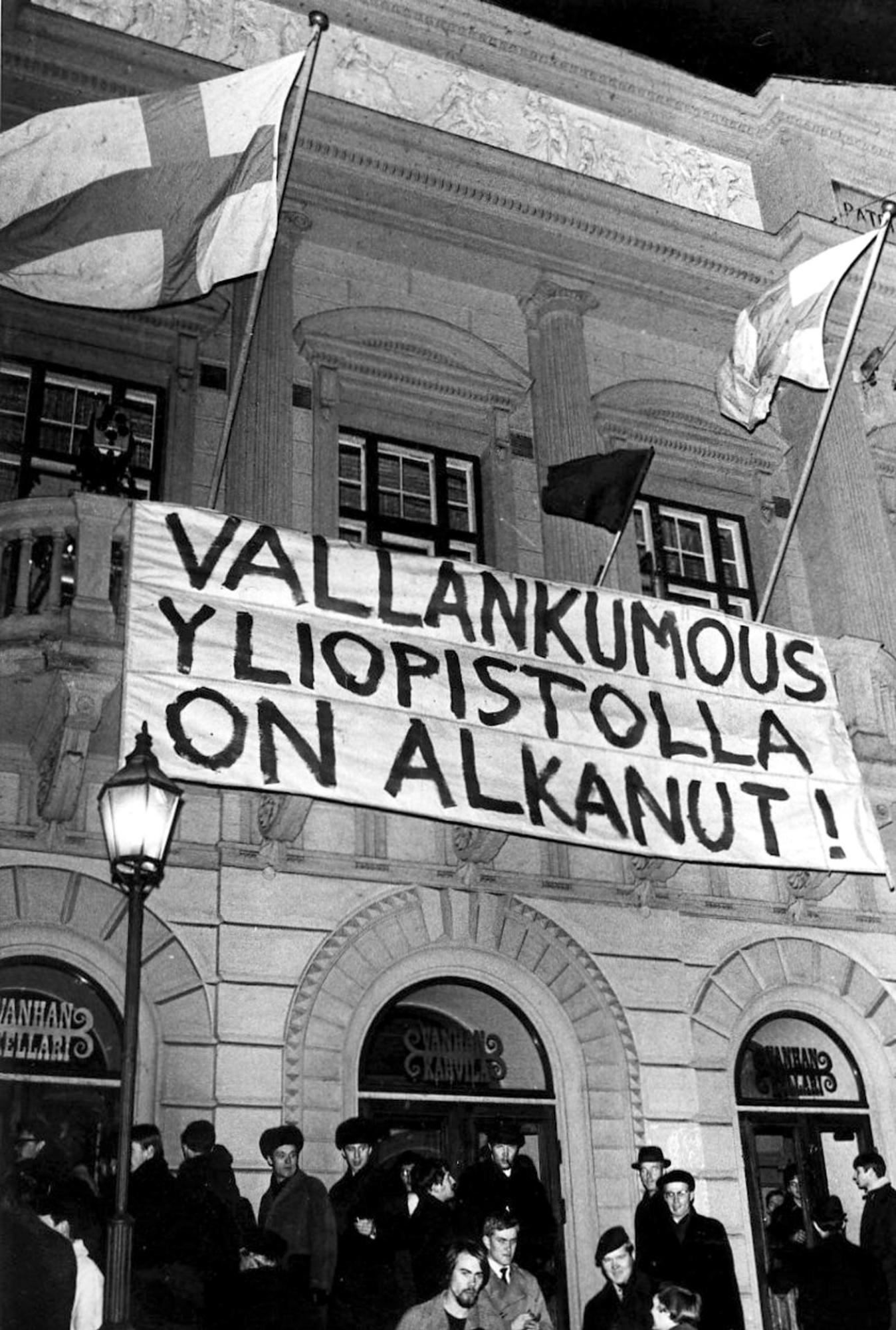
A banner outside of the building: “The revolution at the University has begun!”

The takeover of Vanha (Finnish: Vanhan valtaus) was an uprising by a number of students on November 25, 1968, at the Old Student House (Vanha) of the University of Helsinki in Finland. It occurred on the night of the 100th birthday of the university's student union. The rioters took over Vanha during the celebrations, demanding changes to the university's administration and the curriculum.

The group entered by breaking in through a French window at 17:13 local time. The event immediately made nationwide headlines. The action was seen as inspired by the May 1968 unrest in France, as well as other political movements around Europe during the same year, including the Prague Spring. In 2008, Laura Kolbe, a professor of European history at the University of Helsinki and also a member of the centrist Centre Party, described the protest as "the ripples of the European student movement in Finland".

== Motives ==
The dissidents' main demands concerned democratic reforms to the university's administration. However, some of the participants also demanded the founding of Marxist-Leninist study-circles in the departments and faculties, abolishing compulsory membership of the Student Union and changing the political alignment of the monthly student magazine Ylioppilaslehti. Banners carrying these proclamations were hung from the Student House's balcony and speeches were made. However, not all of the youth involved were communists; people aligned with the centrist-agrarian Centre Party participated as well.

== Events ==
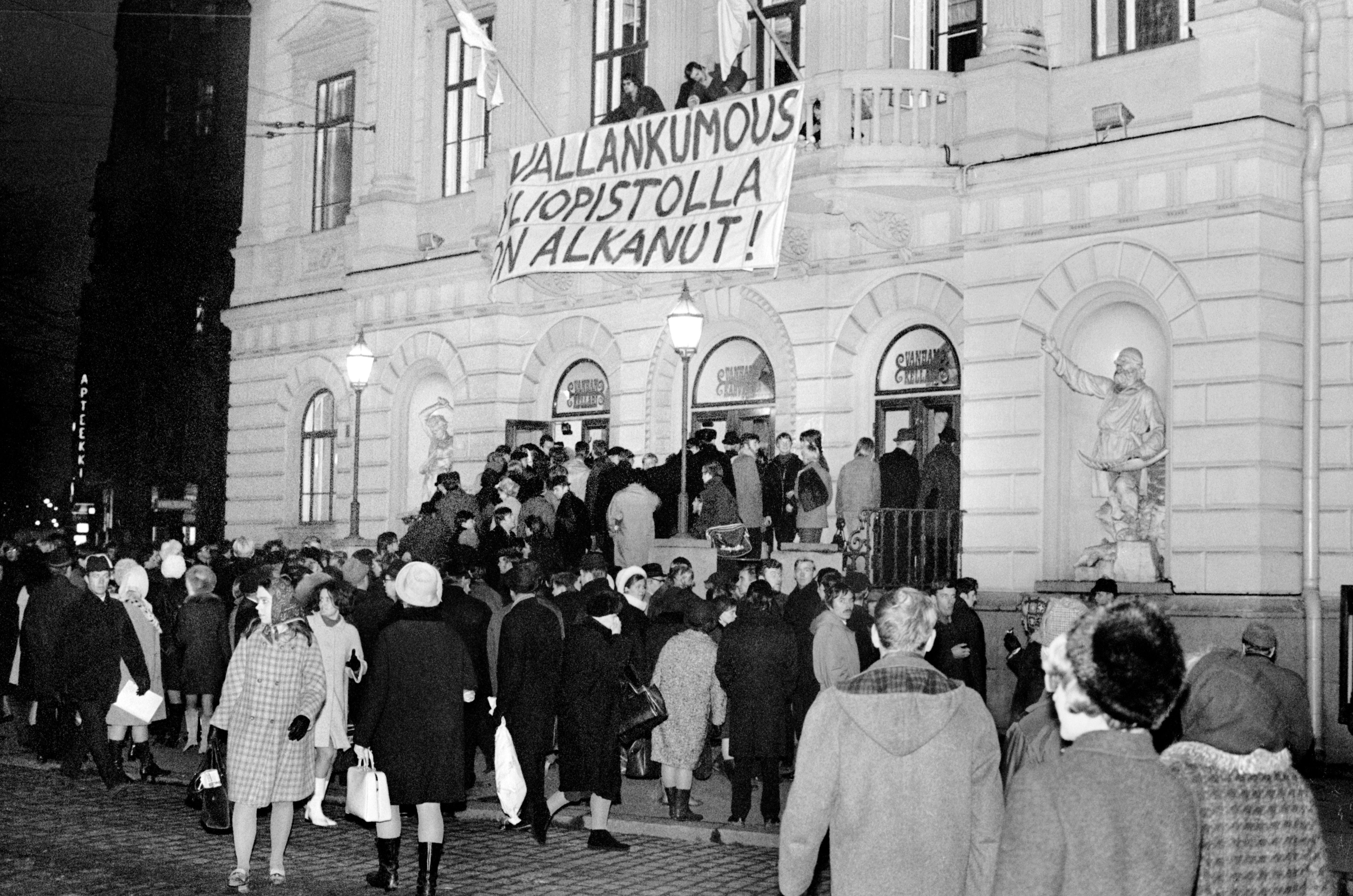
People storming the Old Student House

The takeover was part of the radicalization of the European student movement and was partly a result of the student riots in Paris earlier that year. A few right-wing students who opposed the takeover threw smoke bombs into the ballroom, but otherwise the takeover was completely peaceful. The occupants had agreed on security measures with the police and the fire department. The student opposition, which called themselves Ylioppilaat – studenterna, demanded student democracy, the establishment of Marxist groups in faculties to expose the bourgeois attitude of teaching, the removal of compulsory membership of the student union and changing the line of Ylioppilaslehti. The occupiers also criticized the student union's distancing from ordinary students and its financial committee, which was considered to be in excessive cooperation with commercial banks.

The students gathered in the old student hall sent President Urho Kekkonen a telegram in which they appealed that the president not participate in the student union's 100th anniversary celebration. However, Kekkonen arrived at the party, which had to be moved to the Conservatory, and in his speech unexpectedly expressed his support for the students who took over Vanha. After fire speeches had been held in the Old Student House almost around the clock, the takeover ended in the evening of November 26 in a calm atmosphere after the takers cleaned the house before going home.

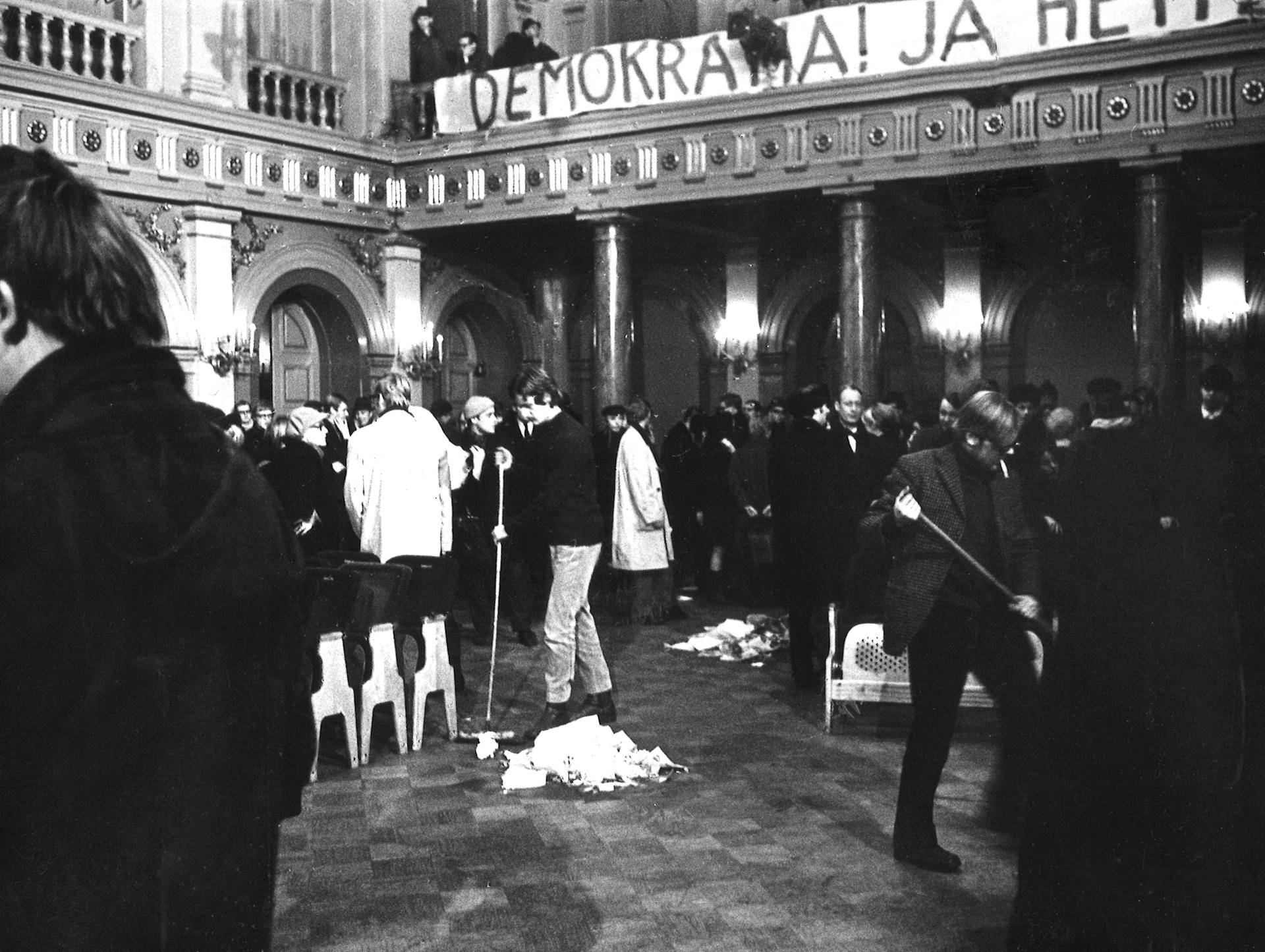
Cleanup after the takeover

The Student Union relocated its 100th year celebration to the Sibelius Academy, and the "Vanha occupation" was relatively short-lived. After having spent the night at the Student House, people began to dissipate the next day. By the evening the remaining occupants had cleaned up after themselves and left the building altogether. Helsinki's Swedish-language newspaper HBL wrote "people became tired and went home after having stayed up for a day, sat on the floor, drank red wine and kissed".

=== Participants ===
Several participants would later become well-known. These include: Maarit Sinervo, Tarleena Sammalkorpi, Antti Kuusi, Nils Torvalds, Anssi Sinnemäki, Juhani Koskinen, Matti Viikari, Matti Wuori, Peter von Bagh, Liisa Manninen, Johan von Bonsdorff, Marianne Laxén, Marja-Leena Mikkola, Jaakko Laakso, Pentti Saarikoski, Pentti Saaritsa, Kari Aronpuro, Jarkko Laine, Jussi Kylätasku, Jaakko Pakkasvirta, Riitta Suominen, Ilkka Taipale, Matti Salo, Kai Linnilä, Kati Peltola, Valdemar Melanko, Kimmo Kevätsalo, Atte Blom, Erkki Tuomioja, Ilkka-Christian Björklund, Hannu Taanila, Jyrki Vesikansa and Risto Volanen.

== Effects ==
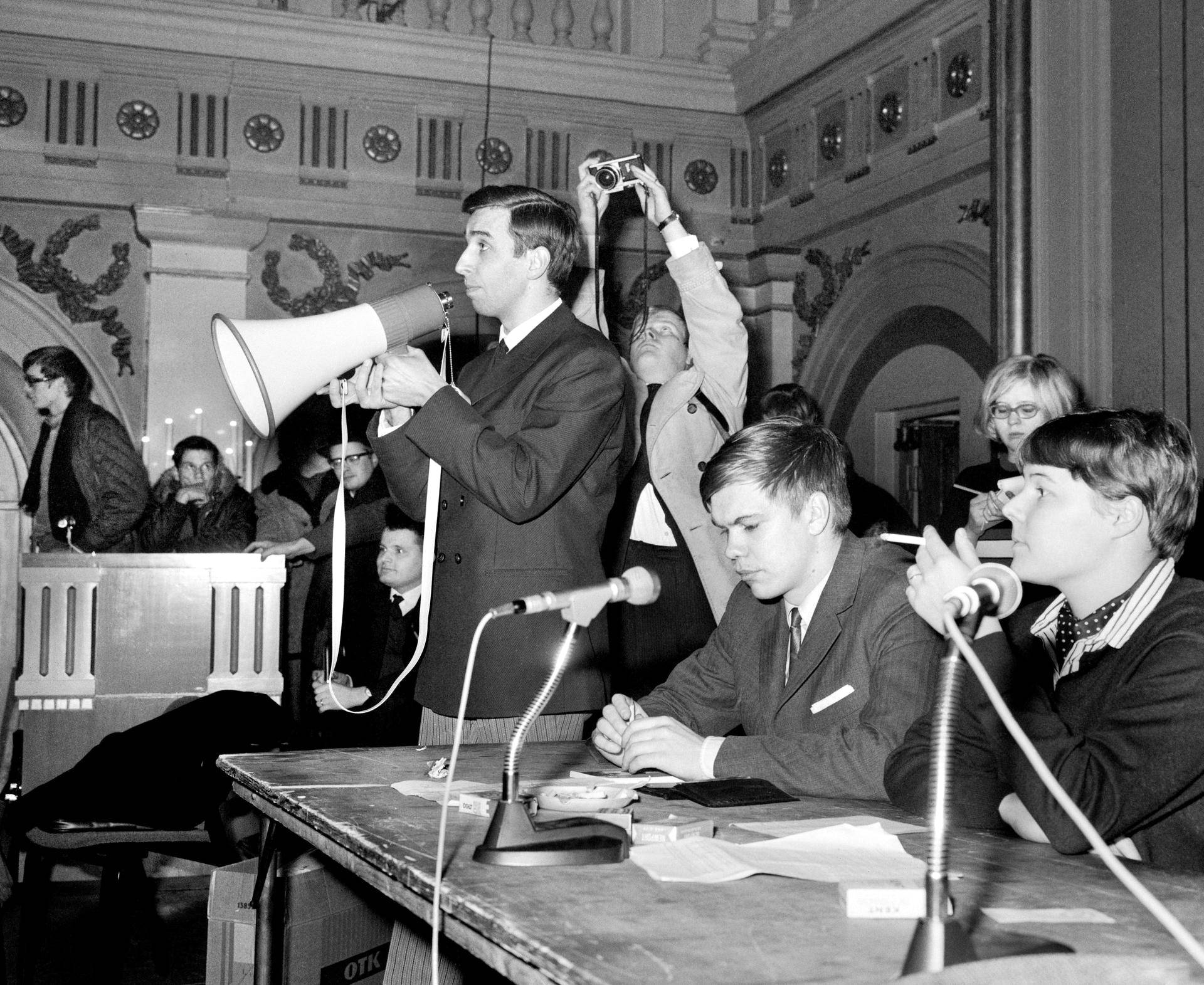
Occupants of the old student hall: Elias Tunkelo holding a megaphone, Marianne Laxén (right) and Jarmo Mäkelä sitting in front.

YLE A-report, from 1989, From Revolution to Consumption, which marked 20 years since the occupation, examined the causes of student radicalism in Europe. The report interviewed people who had participated in the occupation, including film director Peter von Bagh, who stated that the end result of student radicalism in the 1960s was "miserable and that the radicals of that time had become even more settled and rigid over time". Bagh also stated that student radicalism was "a horrifying example of how beautiful dreams could be ruined in life and how he is ashamed of his own generation, who, according to him, have become creeps, assholes, scoundrels and limbos.".

According to journalist Jan Erola, the radicalized student movement became politicized soon after the occupation of Vanha at the turn of the year 1968–69. The communists split definitively into two camps: the majority (saarelaiset), following the chairman Aarne Saari, and the fiercely left-wing taistolaiset, led by the vice-chairman Taisto Sinisalo.

Laura Kolbe, professor of European history at the University of Helsinki, analyzes that the effects of the Old Conquest mostly focused on customs, sexual behavior and morality. The young people also changed their perception of the church, the fatherland and society. The idea behind the takeover of the university's administrative reform in a student-democratic direction was realized only in 1991. The takeover of the old one quickly turned into a myth, which, according to Kolbe's assessment, was caused by the perception of "their own excellence" by the generation that brought about the events.

According to Professor Timo Vihavainen, Kekkonen's sympathy for radical students opened the way for the young generation to leadership positions in society quite quickly. A few of those who took part in the takeover of Vanha, one of whom was Erkki Tuomioja, entered the parliament in the very next election in 1970, and many other leading figures of the radicals were placed in visible and well-paid positions and activities in the early years of the 1970s. Compared to the student riots in Paris in the spring and early summer of 1968, the takeover of Vanha was a muted echo of them, and the then Prime Minister Mauno Koivisto dismissed the movement of the Finnish student youth as "youth flatulence".

Doctor of Political Science Jukka Tarkka has characterized the takeover of Vanha as a watershed in the history of the Finnish student movement: it ended the happy hippie phase of radicalism and was a leap into the new decade.

=== Legacy ===
The generation of students and other young radicals who participated in the events have underlined the significance of the occupation as a symbolic revolt against the values of the previous generation. Indeed, many of the people involved became leading figures in Finnish politics and the financial sector, including the Social Democratic Party politicians Erkki Tuomioja, Ilkka Taipale and Ulf Sundqvist, bank manager Björn Wahlroos and diplomat Markus Lyra. However, 40 years after the events, only 36% of the Helsingin Sanomat board of selected Finnish intellectuals believed the events had any positive effect on the Finnish society.

On Monday, November 24, 2008, on the eve of the 40th anniversary of the takeover of Vanha, a group of students playfully took it over again.

== See also ==
- Occupation of the Student Union Building in Sweden
