= Borgerliga Studenter – Opposition '68 =

Borgerliga Studenter – Opposition '68 is a centre-right political fraction of the compulsory student union at Stockholm University, created in 1968 as a reaction against the leftist student uprisings earlier the same year. Among its leading members have been Carl Bildt and Fredrik Reinfeldt, who both later would become Swedish prime ministers.
