= Bildt family =

Swedish noble family

Bildt
- Swedish noble family
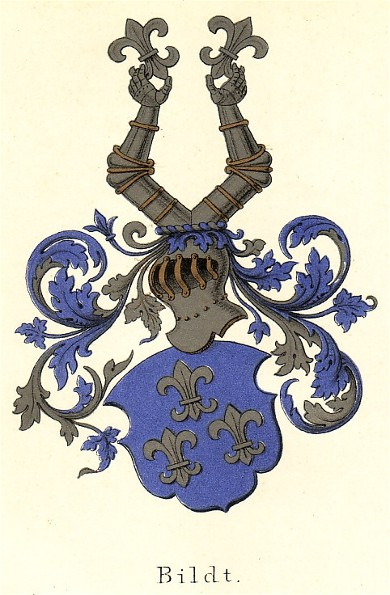
- Current region: Northern Europe (mainly Sweden)
- Origin: Jylland, Denmark
- Estate: Morlanda manor

The Bildt family is a Scandinavian noble family – uradel – of Danish origin, noted for counting two of its members as Swedish prime ministers. The Bildt family was naturalized as a Swedish noble family at the Swedish house of nobility in 1664 (No. 678).

== Notable members ==
- Carl Bildt (born 1949), Swedish prime minister
- Carl Bildt (1850–1931), Swedish diplomat and historian
- Gillis Bildt (1820–1894), Swedish baron and prime minister
- Knut Gillis Bildt (1854–1927), Swedish army officer and politician
