= Anna Maria Corazza Bildt =

Italian-Swedish politician

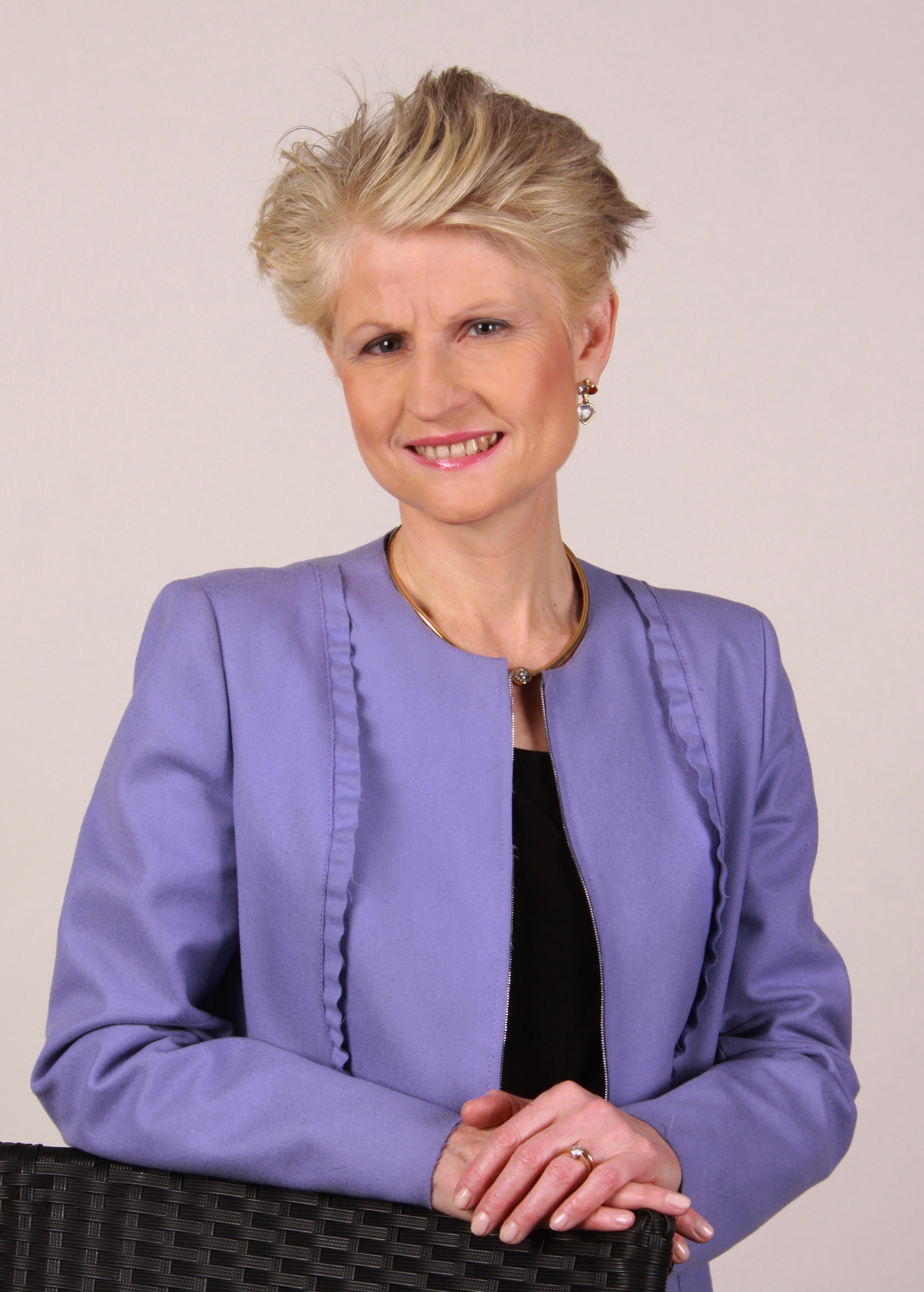
- Anna Maria Corazza Bildt in February 2014

Member of the European Parliament
- In office 14 July 2009 – 1 July 2019
- Constituency: Sweden

Personal details
- Born: Anna Maria Corazza; 10 March 1963 (age 63) Rome, Italy
- Citizenship: Italy; Sweden
- Party: Liberalerna (2023–present)
- Other political affiliations: Moderate Party (until 2023); European People's Party (2009–2019)
- Spouse: Carl Bildt (m. 1998)
- Children: 1
- Education: University of San Diego; Columbia University

Anna Maria Corazza Bildt (née Anna Maria Corazza; born 10 March 1963) is an Italian-Swedish entrepreneur and politician, Member of the European Parliament between 2009 and 2019. She was elected as a member of the Swedish Moderate Party (part of the European People's Party), but switched to Liberalerna (part of Renew Europe) ahead of the 2024 European Parliament election.

Corazza Bildt is a trustee at 5Rights Foundation, an organisation founded by Baroness Beeban Kidron to promote the rights of children online.

== Early career ==
In 1998, she married Carl Bildt, former Prime Minister of Sweden (1991–1994), former leader of the Swedish Moderate Party (1986–1999) and subsequent Foreign Minister (2006–2014). The two met in the Balkans where she had been working for the United Nations during the Yugoslav wars and he served as the first High Representative in Bosnia. They now have one child together. She owns and runs Italian Tradition, a company importing Parmesan cheese, as well as Borgo di Tabiano Castello, a hotel near Fidenza.

== Member of the European Parliament, 2009–2019 ==
Corazza Bildt successfully ran for MEP in the 2009 elections. She received 14.3% of Moderate personal votes. This was only surpassed by party top name Gunnar Hökmark (15.2%). She successfully ran for re-election in the 2014 elections. She received 16.37% of Moderate personal votes, putting down top name Gunnar Hökmark (12.08%)

Corazza Bildt served as vice chair of the Committee on Internal Market and Consumer Protection, and a member of the Committee on Women's Rights and Gender Equality. In addition to her committee assignments, she co-chaired the European Parliament Intergroup on Children's Rights<European Parliament Intergroup on Children’s Rights European Parliament.> and was a member of the European Parliament Intergroup on LGBT Rights.

In 2014, Corazza Bildt was appointed as the leader of the Single Seat campaign in favor of abandoning Strasbourg for Brussels as the sole location of the European Parliament.

In 2015, news media reported that Corazza Bildt was included in a Russian blacklist of prominent people from the European Union who are not allowed to enter the country.

In 2015, Corazza Bildt made headlines by asking parliamentary officials to check if there were any irregularities with the votes of Marine Le Pen, which prompted the European Parliament to open an investigation into whether MEPs voted on Le Pen's behalf, which would be a violation of the body's rules. She lost her parliamentary seat in the 2019 elections.

== Party switch to Liberalerna ==
On 18 September 2023, it became public that Corrazza Bildt would run in the upcoming 2024 European Parliament election, but this time for Liberalerna.

== Other activities ==
- Kangaroo Group, Member

== Honours ==
- Italy: Grand Officer of the Order of the Star of Italian Solidarity (3 April 2010)
