= Centre for European Reform =

European integration think tank

- Formation: 1996
- Revenue: £1.4 million (2024)
- Expenses: £1.4 million (2024)
- Staff: 12 (2024)
- Website: cer.eu

The Centre for European Reform (CER) is a London-based think tank that focuses on matters of European integration. In 2021 it was ranked 58th among the top think tanks worldwide (non-US) in the Global Go To Think Tank Index Report published by the Think Tanks and Civil Societies Program.

== Background and activity ==
CER was founded in 1996. Charles Grant, a journalist at The Economist, left his position there in 1998 to work at CER on a full-time basis, and has led the organization since then. Its positions tend to be anti-regulatory.

== See also ==
- Bruegel (think tank)
- Centre for European Policy Studies
- European Policy Centre
- Merchants of Doubt
