= Occupation of the Student Union Building =

1968 protest in Sweden

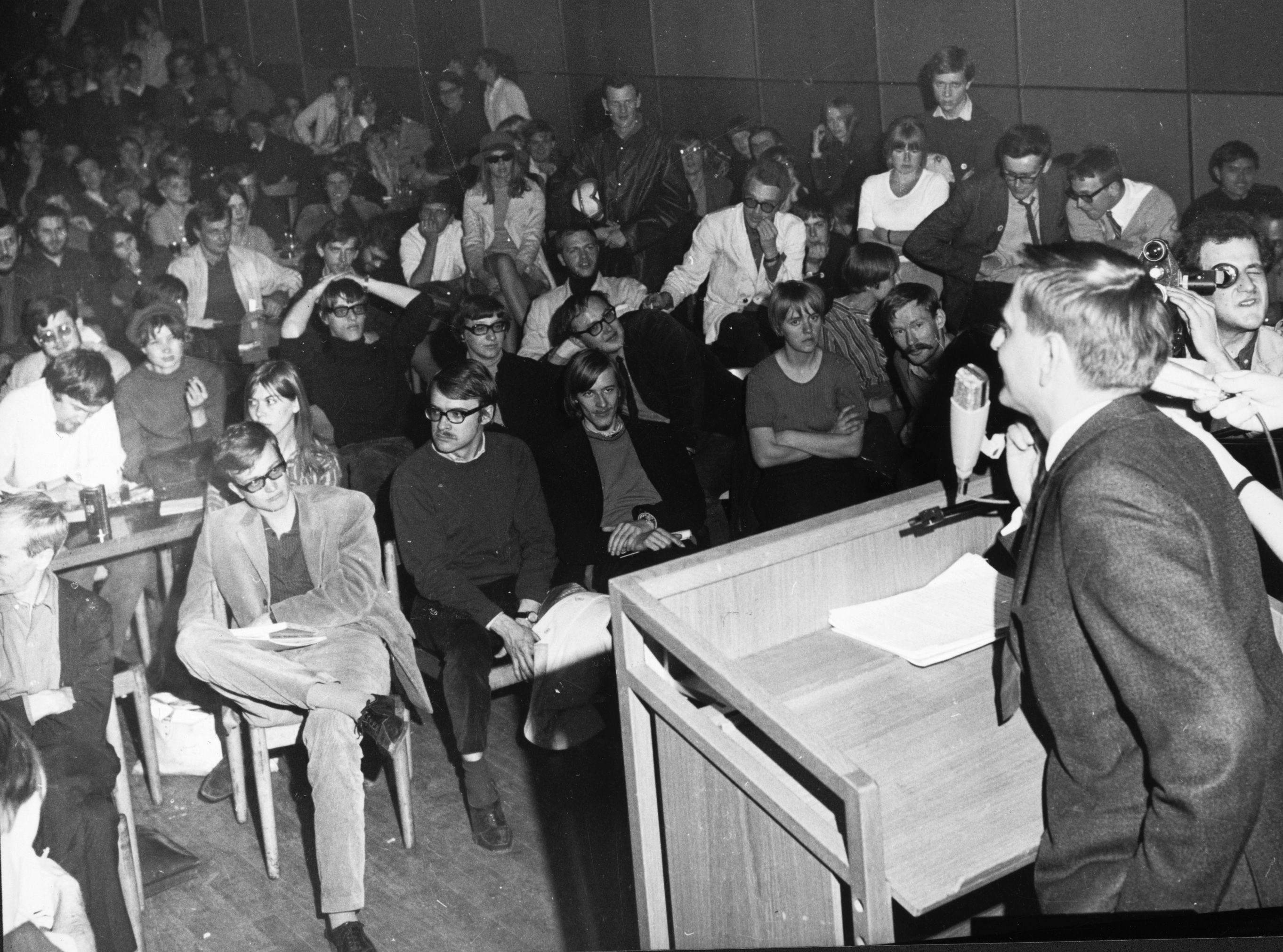
Minister of education Olof Palme addressing students during the occupation

The occupation of the Student Union Building (Swedish: Kårhusockupationen) was an uprising by students at Stockholm University that took place at the building of the Stockholm University Student Union between 24 and 27 May 1968. While the uprising grew out of opposition to a proposed higher education reform, the uprising was also inspired by the May 1968 events in France, and part of a worldwide wave of protests that year.

== Background ==
During the early years of the 1960s, the number of students in Sweden had doubled. Many of these students, especially in the humanities and social sciences, were taking independent courses, which raised concerns within the government about students not completing their studies. In the spring of 1968, a working group appointed by the Ministry of Finance proposed that humanistic and social disciplines be reformed into degree programmes, and that students who did not complete previous courses be suspended from further studies.

== Events ==
On 24 May 1968, an open meeting to discuss the proposed reforms was called by the Left Student Club at Stockholm University, held at the Stockholm University Student Union building at Holländargatan in Stockholm. Although students from all parts of the political spectrum took part in the meeting, the majority of the attendants were leftist students who opposed the reforms, viewing them as a way of adapting higher education to the needs of the business sector. A few hours into the meeting, the attendants decided to occupy the building in order to bring attention to their concerns.

Late in the evening of 24 May, then-minister of education Olof Palme arrived at the building to address the students. Palme defended the proposed reforms and condemned the occupiers for using extra-parliamentary methods; this angered the students, who responded by heckling Palme.

Discussions continued on 25 May, and groups formed to distribute flyers in the surrounding city center. In the evening, a public meeting was held in the park outside the building, reportedly attended by more than 1 000 people. The meeting then turned into a spontaneous demonstration through the city center; attempts were made to occupy more prominent buildings, such as Stockholm Central Station and the Royal Swedish Opera, but these were thwarted by police, and the demonstrators returned to the Student Union building. Discussions continued at the building until late night; at this point, the occupiers reportedly numbered between 3 000 and 4 000 people.

On 26 May, further discussions were held. In the evening police blocked the entrances to the building, allowing people to exit but refusing them entry. Right-wing students also gathered in a counter-demonstration outside the building. After negotiations with police, the occupiers decided to end the occupation on 27 May.

== Aftermath ==
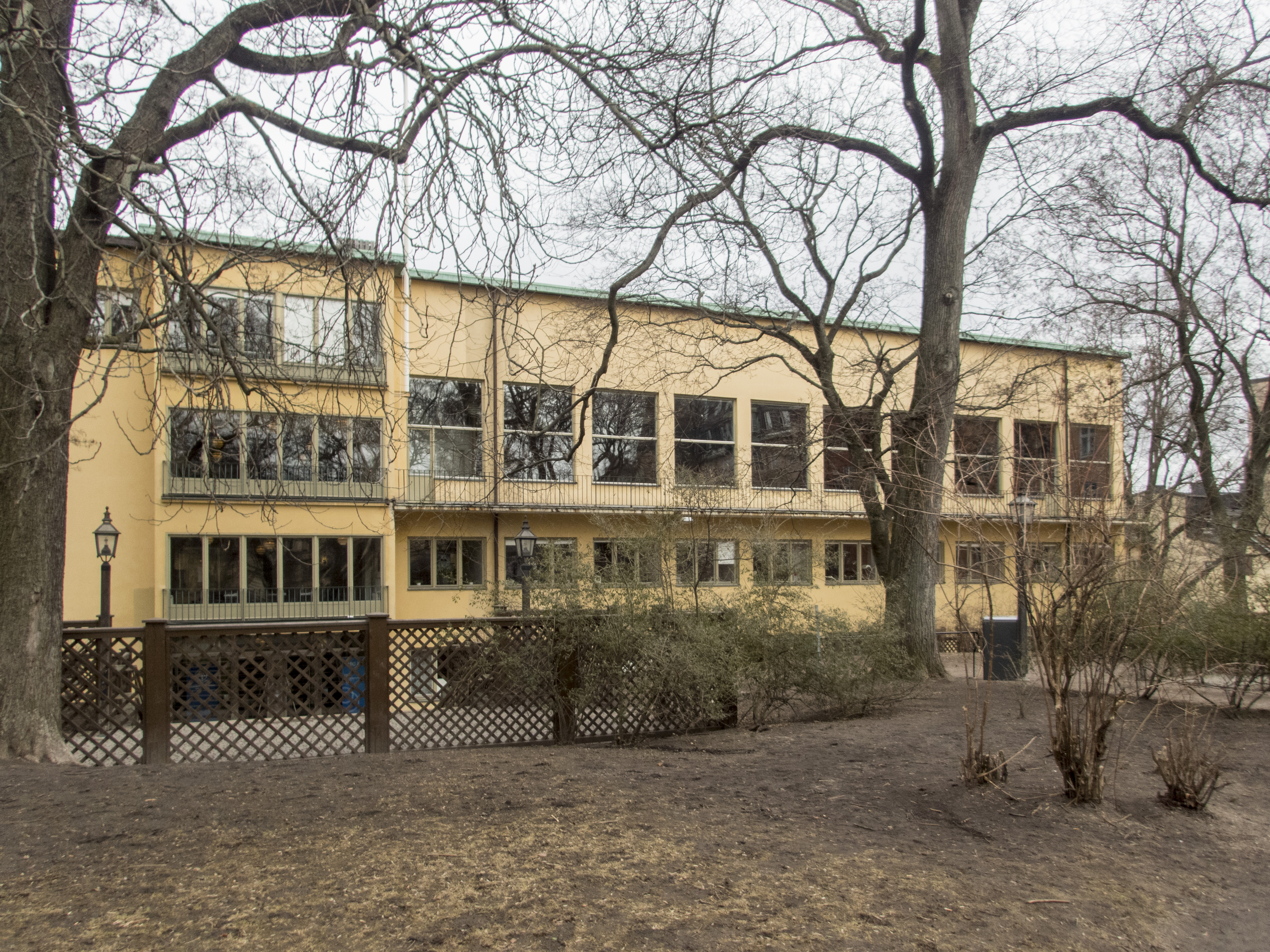
The former Student Union building, pictured in 2016

According to historian Henrik Berggren, the occupation failed in the sense that the planned education reforms were gradually implemented during the following decades. However, Berggren also notes that the event can be seen as foundational for the growth of several related movements in Sweden in the years following 1968 – such as the environmental movement, the feminist movement, and the progressive music movement – and as having brought new energy to already existing social movements.

The student organization Borgerliga Studenter – Opposition '68 was founded by center-right students at Stockholm University as an immediate reaction against the occupation. As of 2018, the former Student Union building belongs to the Stockholm School of Economics.

== See also ==
- Takeover of Vanha
