= Staffan Skott =

Swedish journalist (1943–2021)

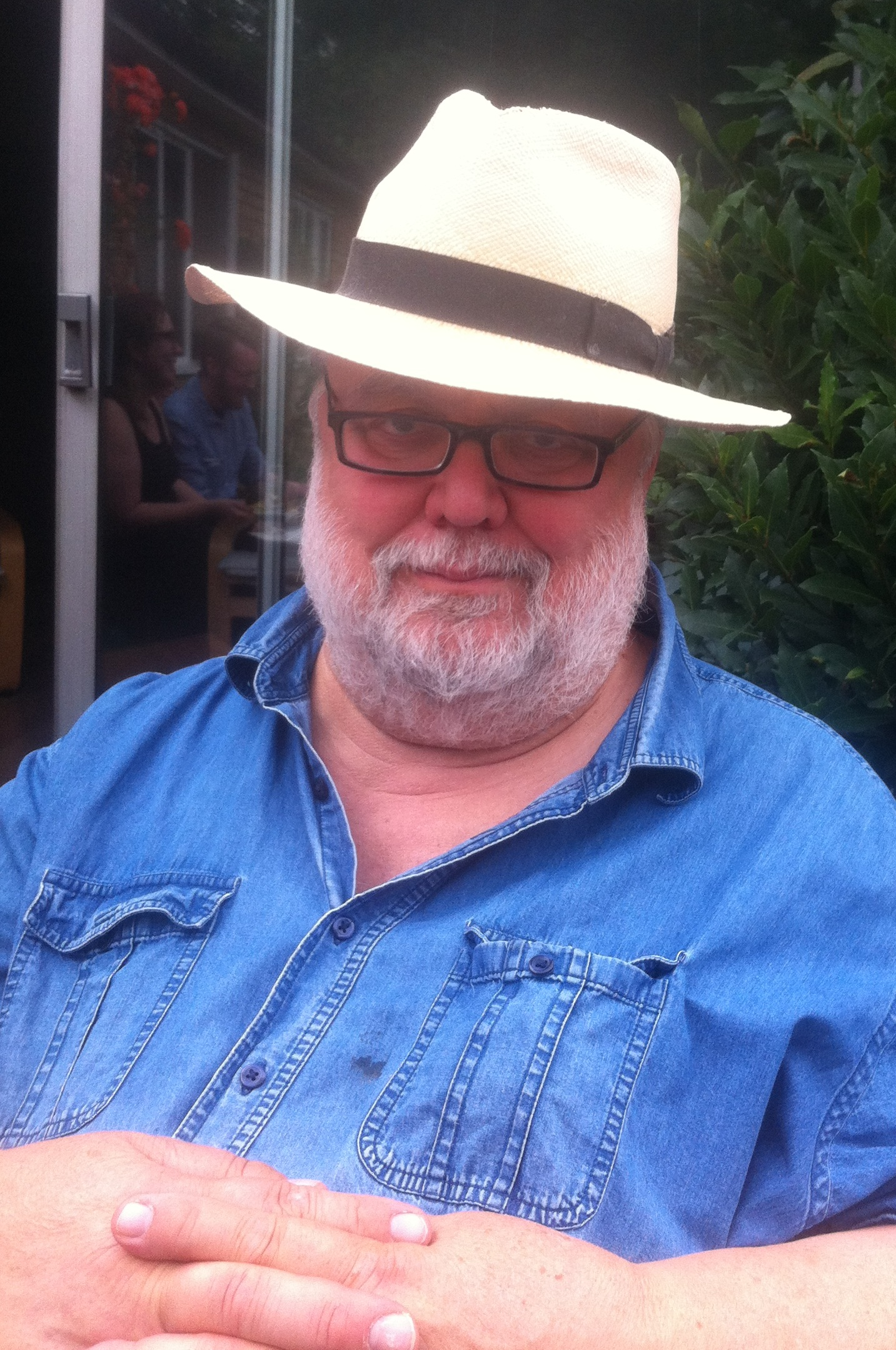
Skott in 2013

Sten Staffan Skott (16 August 1943 – 24 September 2021) was a Swedish journalist, author and translator. He wrote extensively on the history of Russia and the Soviet Union. He was also a writer for the newspaper Dagens Nyheter.

He translated Russian dramas into Swedish, such as the collected works of Anton Chekhov, The Government Inspector by Nikolai Gogol and around 40 other plays. His works have been translated into Norwegian, Finnish, Estonian, Polish and Russian.

Skott authored the book Aldrig mer! ("Never Again!"), which deals with the genocides and crimes against humanity committed in states under Communist party rule.
