= Stockholm University Student Union =

Stockholm University Student Union Stockholms Universitets Studentkår
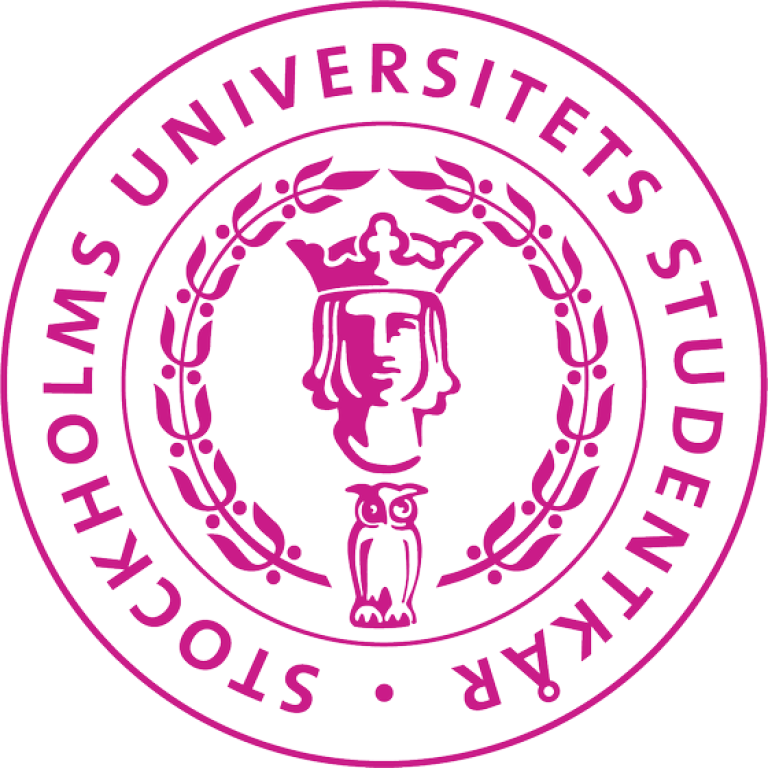
- President: Victor Nygren
- 1st Vice Chairman: Kai Nuñez Wiklund
- Founded: 1883; 142 years ago (foundation); 1 January 1887; 138 years ago (official)
- Headquarters: Universitetsvägen 2A 114 18 Stockholm, Stockholm, Sweden
- Membership: 10,000
- Ideology: Politics of Sweden: Liberalism; Social Democratic; Green politics; Conservatives; Left-wing; Nationalism; Christian Democracy; Socialist patriotism
- Mother party: Stockholm Federation of Student Unions
- National affiliation: Swedish National Union of Students (Student Union); Swedish Confederation of Professional Associations (Trade Union)
- International affiliation: European Students' Union; European Youth Forum
- Newspaper: Studietid; Gaudeamus (historical)
- Website: https://www.sus.se/

The Stockholm University Student Union (SUS) (Swedish: Stockholms Universitets Studentkår) is one of Sweden's largest student organisation, with about 10,000 members as of November 2024. Stockholm University Student Union was founded in 1883.

== Purpose ==
The purpose clause of Stockholm University Student Union (SUS) (Chapter 1, § 2 of the Stockholm University Student Union statutes) establishes that:

- The primary purpose of the Student Union is to monitor and contribute to the development of education and the conditions for studies at Stockholm University.
- The Student Union shall safeguard, promote, and protect students’ interests, particularly concerning educational and social matters related to studies.
- The Student Union shall provide services to its members and promote a strong sense of community among them.

Purpose and Context of the Organisational Plan The organisational plan is one of the Student Union Council's (FUM) directives to the Student Union Board. The purpose of the organisational plan is to outline SUS's work at a comprehensive level by distributing mandates and authority to ensure clear accountability. The relationship between SUS's decision-making and operational functions, as well as its representation of students and doctoral candidates, is regulated in separate directives.

== Organisation ==
The Stockholm University Student Union is a democratic membership organisation. It is controlled by a student council, which all members of the student union can vote for in the Representative Assembly Elections.

== Student Union Council (FUM) ==
The Student Union Council (FUM) is the highest decision-making body of Stockholm University Student Union. It makes decisions on, among other things, SUS's three-year operational plan, framework budget, and the issues SUS will prioritize. FUM also elects the Stockholm University Student Union Board and the Stockholm University Student Union's Presidium composed of the chairman and vice-chairman. The 35 students elected to FUM meet four times each academic year.

== Stockholm University Student Union Board ==
The Stockholm University Student Union Board is responsible for the organisation's operations and manages and delegates work by including deciding on Stockholm University Student Union's one-year operational plan. This plan specifies the operational goals to enable Stockholm University Student Union's office to report results and goal achievement in accordance with the will and decisions of the Student Union Council (FUM).

== Stockholm University Student Union's Presidium ==
The Stockholm University Student Union Chairperson and Vice-chairperson together form the Stockholm University Student Union's Presidium. The Presidium receives its mandate from FUM and an annual directive from the Stockholm University Student Union Board. The Presidium conducts advocacy work, prepares and leads the Board's activities, participates in the office's ongoing work, represents the university's students in central-level forums at Stockholm University, and maintains a forward-looking dialogue with the university's leadership. The two students elected to the Stockholm University Student Union's Presidium are full-time compensated representatives for one year.

== Sources ==
=== External links ===
- Official website of Stockholm University Student Union (in Swedish)
- Stockholm University Student Union (in English)
