= Stockholm Federation of Student Unions =

The Stockholm Federation of Student Unions (Swedish: Stockholms studentkårers centralorganisation, SSCO) is an organisation for cooperation between students' unions in the Stockholm region. Through its 43 affiliated student unions SSCO represents around 100000 students. Founded in 1896, the organisation’s original focus was providing services to the students in Stockholm. Since then SSCO has moved towards working as a lobby organisation and today the main focus of SSCO is influencing politicians on the local, regional and national levels. The organisation's presiding officers represent the students towards the City of Stockholm, the Stockholm County Council, the Stockholm County Administrative Board, and within the Assembly for Presidents and Vice-Chancellors of the universities and university colleges in Stockholm.

SSCO is also the principal body for Sweden's largest provider of student accommodation, Stiftelsen Stockholms Studentbostäder (SSSB), which owns and administrates 8000 student rooms and apartments. The organisation is involved in a constant political struggle to improve housing conditions for students in the Stockholm region.

In cooperation with the Nobel Foundation, the organisation is responsible for arranging the students' participation during the annual Nobel Banquet in Stockholm on 10 December.

Among its notable member organisations are the Student Association at the Stockholm School of Economics, the Stockholm University Student Union, and the Student Union at the Royal Institute of Technology.

== See also ==
- Swedish National Union of Students
