= Stefan Hedlund =

Swedish economist

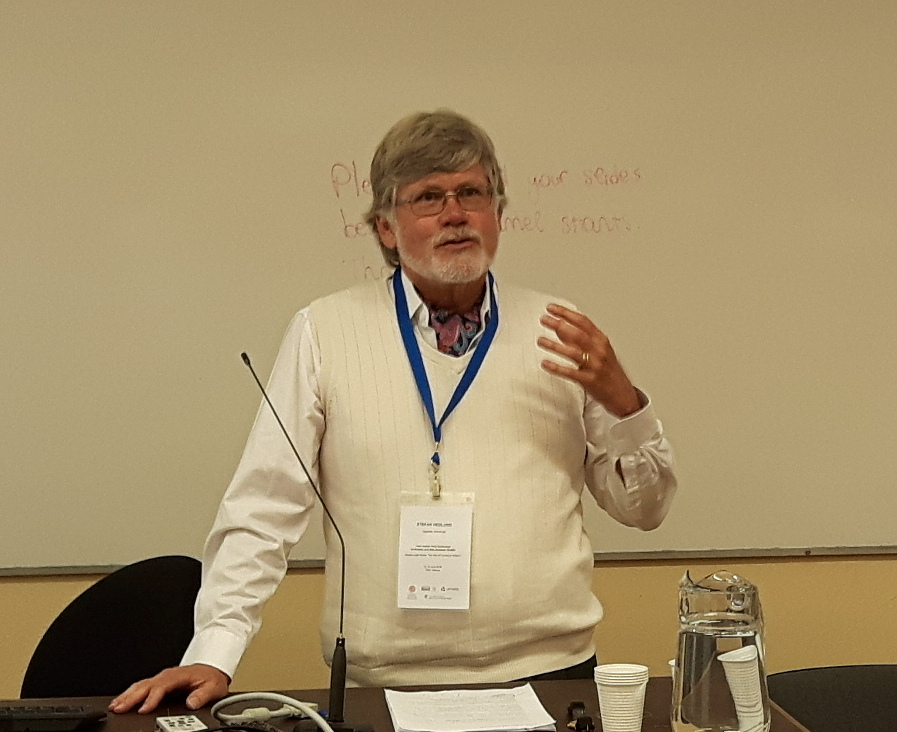
Stefan Hedlund

Stefan Peter Hedlund (born 20 December 1953) is a Swedish academic, an expert on Soviet and Communist studies/Russian studies, and Professor of East European Studies at Uppsala University (since 1990). Currently he is also Research Director at UCRS Centre for Russian and Eurasian Studies. He has published extensively on the Soviet economic system, Russian economic reform and the attempted transition to democracy and market economy.

He earned his PhD in economics at Lund University in 1983, where he served as lecturer of economics from 1978. After a short stint as a Senior Analyst at the Bureau of Soviet and East European Affairs in 1983, he was a research fellow at the Department of Economics at Lund University, until being appointed assistant professor of Soviet and East European Studies at Uppsala University in 1984. He was an Assistant and associate professor of economics at Lund University 1985–1990, and became Professor of Soviet and East European Studies at Uppsala University in 1990. Stefan Hedlund had fellowships at Davis Centre for Russian and Eurasian Studies (Harvard University), Slavic Research Center (Hokkaido University) and Stanford University.

He also writes for World Review and Prince Michael of Liechtenstein's Geopolitical Intelligence Services AG.

== Selected publications ==
- Per-Arne Bodin, Stefan Hedlund, and Elena Namli (eds.). Power and Legitimacy: Challenges from Russia (Routledge, 2012).
- Invisible Hands, Russian Experience, and Social Science: Approaches to Understanding Systemic Failure (Cambridge University Press, 2011)
- Russia since 1980: Wrestling with Westernization (Cambridge University Press, 2008), with Steven Rosefielde
- Institutionell teori: ekonomiska aktörer, spelregler och samhällsnormer (Studentlitteratur, 2007)
- Russian Path Dependence (Routledge, 2005)
- Århundradets brott: historien om hur Jeltsins män plundrade Ryssland (Fischer, 2001)
- Russia's “Market” Economy: A Bad Case of Predatory Capitalism (UCL Press, 1999)
- Rysslands ekonomiska reformer: en studie i politisk ekonomi (SNS, 1996), with Niclas Sundström
- The Baltic States and the end of the Soviet Empire (Routledge, 1993), with Kristian Gerner
- Hur många Ryssland efter Sovjet? (Fischer, 1993)
- Ideology and Rationality in the Soviet Model. A Legacy for Gorbachev (Routledge, 1989), with Kristian Gerner
- Private Agriculture in the Soviet Union (Routledge, 1989)
- Öststatsekonomi (Dialogos, 1986)
- Crisis in Soviet Agriculture? (1983)
