= Swedish National Union of Students =

The Swedish National Union of Students (Swedish: Sveriges Förenade Studentkårer, SFS), is an umbrella organisation of students' unions at higher education facilities in Sweden. The organisation was founded in 1921. It has around 62 affiliated students' unions, gathering around 400,000 students.

The large number of organised students can in part be explained by the fact that membership in the official local students' union was mandatory for students at universities and university colleges in Sweden until 2010. The requirement has a long history back to the precursor to Swedish students' unions, the students' nations where membership became mandatory in 1667.

The local students' union is, however, free to decide whether to join the National Union of Students or not. Although a majority of the students' unions are members, some have opted to stay out, including several organising business, law and medicine students. Occasionally, affiliated unions choose to leave the organisation, but sometimes rejoin at a later date, a pattern followed by both the Stockholm University Students' Union and the Uppsala Student Union.

The organisation works to represent the interest of its members on a national level, towards the Government, the Swedish Parliament, the political parties and the government agencies concerned with higher education. The organisation is also active on the international arena, particularly within the European Students' Union, ESU.

At the annual national conference representatives from the member students' unions meet to decide on the policy framework of the organisation and to elect a national board. The board has 11 members, including the President and Vice President, in 2023 it was voted that the board 24/25 will have 9 board members with the President and Vice accountedfor. The President and the Vice Presidents work full-time at the head office in Stockholm during their term.

Several former student politicians in Sweden have moved on to high-level national party politics. Among them are Olof Palme (President 1953), and Fredrik Reinfeldt (Board member 1989/90)

== Doctoral students ==
Postgraduate or doctoral students have a committee within SFS called SFS Doktorandkommitté (SFS DK). Formerly, the organisation Sveriges Doktorander (Sweden's Doctoral Students, SDok) existed. SDok was formed on 29 April 1997, aiming to contribute to improving research education in Sweden and to encourage deeper collaboration and increase the exchange of information between the country's doctoral students. One of the aims of SDok was to influence Student Unions and universities/colleges to employ Doctoral Student Councillors (doktorandombudsman). In 2008, SDok was merged with SFS DK.

SFS DK is a member of Eurodoc, the European federation of national organisations of young researchers.

== See also ==
- Nations at Swedish universities
- Stockholm Federation of Student Unions
