= Double genocide theory =

Equation of Soviet atrocities against Eastern Europeans to the Holocaust

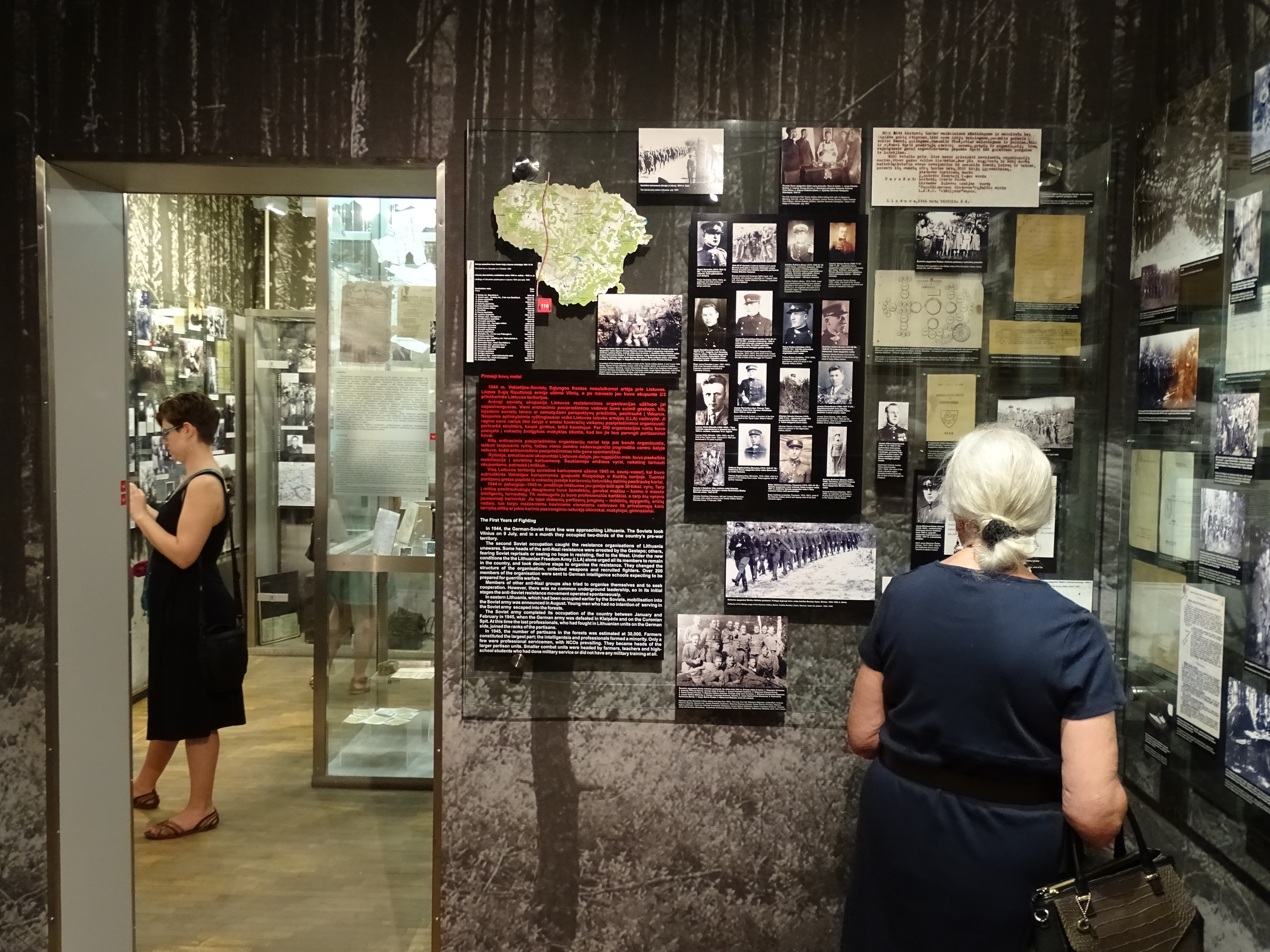
A display on anti-Soviet partisans at the Lithuanian Museum of Occupations and Freedom Fights, formerly known as the Museum of Genocide Victims, that has been criticised for insufficient coverage of the Holocaust

Double genocide theory (Lithuanian: Dvigubo genocido požiūris, lit. 'Double genocide approach') is a term used to refer to the claim that the atrocities committed by the Soviet Union against Eastern Europeans constitute a genocide that was equivalent in scale and nature to the Holocaust, in which approximately six million Jews were systematically murdered by Nazi Germany. The theory first gained popularity in Lithuania after the fall of the Soviet Union in 1991, particularly in discussions about the Holocaust in Lithuania.

A more extreme version of the theory vindicates the actions of local Nazi collaborators as retaliatory by accusing Jews of complicity in Soviet repression, especially in Lithuania, eastern Poland, and northern Romania. Some scholars have criticized the double genocide theory as a form of Holocaust trivialization.

== History ==
After the fall of the Soviet Union, many post-Soviet states, particularly the Baltic states, built more memorials to victims of the Soviet occupation, and devoted public resources to historical committees that prioritized their nations' suffering under Soviet occupation over the suffering of their nation's Jews under Nazi occupation.

In Lithuania, the Museum of Genocide Victims (now the Museum of Occupations and Freedom Fights) was opened in 1992, memorializing the victims of crimes against humanity during Soviet occupation, but rarely mentioned the Holocaust in Lithuania. Until 2011, the Holocaust was mentioned only once in the entire museum, compared to the two rooms devoted to the Soviet occupation. According to Ljiljana Radonić, a political scientist specializing in national memory, said that "the way in which Jewish victims are portrayed there shows that this reference to the Holocaust is merely perfunctory." In Lithuania's state Jewish museum's main building, a plaque asserts that "The first killings of Jews have been performed in the context of the war chaos." In this context, some basic postulates of the double genocide theory were developed. Some Lithuanian nationalists, backed by the state, claimed that various nationalist collaborators were anti-Soviet heroes, that Jewish victims were merely collateral damage in the fog of war, and any documentation that counters this is Soviet propaganda. However, the historical record shows that Lithuanian Jews were targeted for extermination—based on their ethnicity—by both the Nazis and local nationalist forces, with local nationalists taking a leading role in the genocide.

Lithuanian historian Vytautas Berenis commented that the double genocide theory has considerable influence in Lithuanian historiography and journalism. Berenis states that Lithuanian nationalists excuse their country's collaboration by asserting that collaborators were merely retaliating against "Jewish communists" that were allegedly over-represented in the ranks of the NKVD and communist party cadres. Berenis says that this theory is incorrect on the merits. Many Jews did not support the Soviets—a disproportionate number of Jews were victims of Soviet deportations. Further, in October 1940, 68.49 percent of members of the Lithuanian Communist Party were ethnic Lithuanians, while 16.24 percent were Jews—but nearly all the victims of nationalist atrocities were Jews. Poet and dissident Tomas Venclova criticized the concept of double genocide in his 1975 essay "Žydai ir lietuviai" ("Jews and Lithuanians") and subsequent publications. According to Venclova, the theory obscures the role of Lithuanians in crimes against humanity committed in Lithuania by assigning all guilt to non-Lithuanian actors.

According to the "Jews in Latvia" Museum director Ilja Lenskis, Jews similarly made up about 12% of the deportees in June deportation from Latvia, while being only 5% of the general population, therefore the narrative that Latvian Jews were "avid supporters of the Soviet regime is simply false, but was a narrative extensively spread by Nazi propaganda" as "the Nazis, who occupied Latvia a bit more than a week after the June Deportations, exploited this trauma" and "offered the very simple explanation that the Jews are guilty".

In 2010, political scientist Evgeny Finkel commented: "There is hardly any country in the vast region from Estonia in the north to Kazakhstan in the south in which either the authorities or the opposition have not seriously considered the idea of officially recognising past sufferings as genocides, often finding creative ways to reconcile the legal definition of the concept ... and the historical record."

== Analysis ==
According to Michael Shafir, the double genocide theory is at worst Holocaust obfuscation. Political scientist Clemens Heni sees it as a form of Holocaust trivialization. Historian Alexander Karn writes that the idea of double genocide "hinge[s] upon the erasure of Lithuanian participation in the Holocaust". Ethnologist Carole Lemée sees it as a symptom of persistent antisemitism.

American Yiddish scholar Dovid Katz describes double genocide theory as a form of Holocaust revisionism, whose debate is prompted by a "movement in Europe that believes the crimes—morally, ethically—of Nazism and Communism are absolutely equal, and that those of us who don't think they're absolutely equal, are perhaps soft on Communism." According to Katz, the double genocide theory is "a relatively recent initiative (though rooted in older apologetics regarding the Holocaust) that seeks to create a moral equivalence between Soviet atrocities committed against the Baltic region and the Holocaust in European history." Katz further writes that "the debate has garnered political traction/currency since the Baltic states joined the European Union in 2004. Since joining the EU, the Baltic states have attempted to downplay their nations' massive collaboration with the Nazis and to enlist the West in revising history in the direction of Double Genocide thinking." Katz recommends that "states in the region honor the victims of Communism and expose the evils of Communism as unique issues, 'without the equals-sign'."

=== Bloodlands ===
Timothy Snyder's book Bloodlands: Europe Between Hitler and Stalin (2010) drew scholarly criticism for being seen as suggesting a moral equivalence between Soviet mass murders and the Nazi Holocaust. Historian Richard J. Evans commented: "It seems to me that he is simply equating Nazi genocide with the mass murders carried out in the Soviet Union under Stalin. ... There is nothing wrong with comparing. It's the equation that I find highly troubling." Efraim Zuroff refers to the book as "the equivalency canard". In a public debate in The Guardian starting in September 2010, Zuroff accused Snyder of providing a scholarly basis for "the historically-inaccurate 'double genocide' theories" by emphasizing the Molotov–Ribbentrop Pact and deflecting the full blame from the major culprit of World War II. Katz commented that "Snyder flirts with the very wrong moral equivalence between Hitler and Stalin", and that Snyder's historical reassessment of the Nazi–Soviet pact coincides with Baltic ultranationalist agendas. Snyder responded: "I coincide with Zuroff and Katz on the centrality of the Holocaust, but we must not overlook how Stalin enabled Hitler's crimes."

=== Holocaust uniqueness debate ===
According to historian Thomas Kühne, going back to the Historikerstreit, conservative intellectuals such as Ernst Nolte and the Holocaust uniqueness debate, the attempts to link Soviet and Nazi crimes, citing books such as Snyder's Bloodlands as prominent examples, are "as politically tricky today as it was then. As it seems to reduce the responsibility of the Nazis and their collaborators, supporters and claqueurs, it is welcomed in rightist circles of various types: German conservatives in the 1980s, who wanted to 'normalise' the German past, and East European and ultranationalists today, who downplay Nazi crimes and up-play Communist crimes in order to promote a common European memory that merges Nazism and Stalinism into a 'double-genocide' theory that prioritises East European suffering over Jewish suffering, obfuscates the distinction between perpetrators and victims, and provides relief from the bitter legacy of East Europeans' collaboration in the Nazi genocide."

=== Memory politics and the Holocaust in Eastern Europe ===
Red Holocaust was coined by the Institute of Contemporary History (Munich Institut für Zeitgeschichte) at Munich. Soviet and Communist studies scholar Steven Rosefielde referred to a "Red Holocaust" for all "peacetime state killings" under Communist states. According to historian Jörg Hackmann, this term is not popular among scholars in Germany or internationally. Historian Alexandra Laignel-Lavastine writes that usage of this term "allows the reality it describes to immediately attain, in the Western mind, a status equal to that of the extermination of the Jews by the Nazi regime." Shafir states that the use of the term supports the "competitive martyrdom component of Double Genocide". Political scientist George Voicu writes that Leon Volovici has "rightfully condemned the abusive use of this concept as an attempt to 'usurp' and undermine a symbol specific to the history of European Jews." According to political scientist Jelena Subotić, the Holocaust memory was hijacked in post-Communist states in an attempt to erase fascist crimes and local participation to the Holocaust, and use their imagery to represent real or imagined crimes of Communist states as memory appropriation.

According to American ethnographer and Professor of Russian and East European Studies at the University of Pennsylvania Kristen Ghodsee, efforts to institutionalize the "double genocide thesis", or the moral equivalence between the Nazi Holocaust (race murder) and the victims of communism (class murder), in particular the push during the 2008 financial crisis for commemoration of the latter in Europe, can be seen as the response by economic and political elites to fears of a leftist resurgence in the face of devastated economies and extreme social inequalities in both the Eastern and Western worlds as the result of the excesses of neoliberal capitalism. She says that any discussion of the achievements by Communist states, including literacy, education, women's rights, and social security is usually silenced, and any discourse on the subject of communism is focused almost exclusively on Joseph Stalin's crimes and the "double genocide thesis", an intellectual paradigm summed up as such: "1) any move towards redistribution and away from a completely free market is seen as communist; 2) anything communist inevitably leads to class murder; and 3) class murder is the moral equivalent of the Holocaust." By linking all leftist and socialist ideals to the excesses of Stalinism, Ghodsee posits that the elites hope to discredit and marginalize all political ideologies that could "threaten the primacy of private property and free markets".

In The Holocaust/Genocide Template in Eastern Europe (2020), political scientist Ljiljana Radonić discusses how "the 'memory wars' in the course of the post-Communist re-narration of history since 1989 and the current authoritarian backlash" and how "'mnemonic warriors' employ the 'Holocaust template' and the concept of genocide in tendentious ways to justify radical policies and externalize the culpability for their international isolation and worsening social and economic circumstances domestically." In this sense, "the 'double genocide' paradigm ... focuses on 'our own' national suffering under—allegedly 'equally' evil—Nazism and Communism". Radonić posits that this theory and charges of Communist genocide come from "a stable of anti-communist émigré lexicon since the 1950s and more recently revisionist politicians and scholars" as well as the "comparative trivialization" of the Holocaust that "results from tossing postwar killings of suspected Axis collaborators and opponents of Tito's regime into the same conceptual framework as the Nazi murder of six million of Jews", describing this as "an effort to demonize communism more broadly as an ideology akin to Nazism".

== Notable cases ==
In 2006, historian Yitzhak Arad, who was a prisoner in the Vilna Ghetto and escaped to join the Soviet partisans, was labelled an "NKVD storm trooper" by Lithuanian newspaper Respublika. In 2008, two elderly Jewish women were investigated for their partisan activities. Arad cited those prosecutions as flowing from the double genocide theory, whose concept is described as follows: "In order to justify the participation of Lithuanians in the mass murder of Jews, there was a perceived need to invent Jews who similarly killed Lithuanians." In response to the investigations, Katz described this as a form of Holocaust obfuscation, another term for the double genocide theory, that "involves a series of false moral equivalences: Jews were disloyal citizens of pre-war Lithuania, helped the Soviet occupiers in 1940, and were therefore partly to blame for their fate. And the genocide that really matters was the one that Lithuanian people suffered at Soviet hands after 1944."

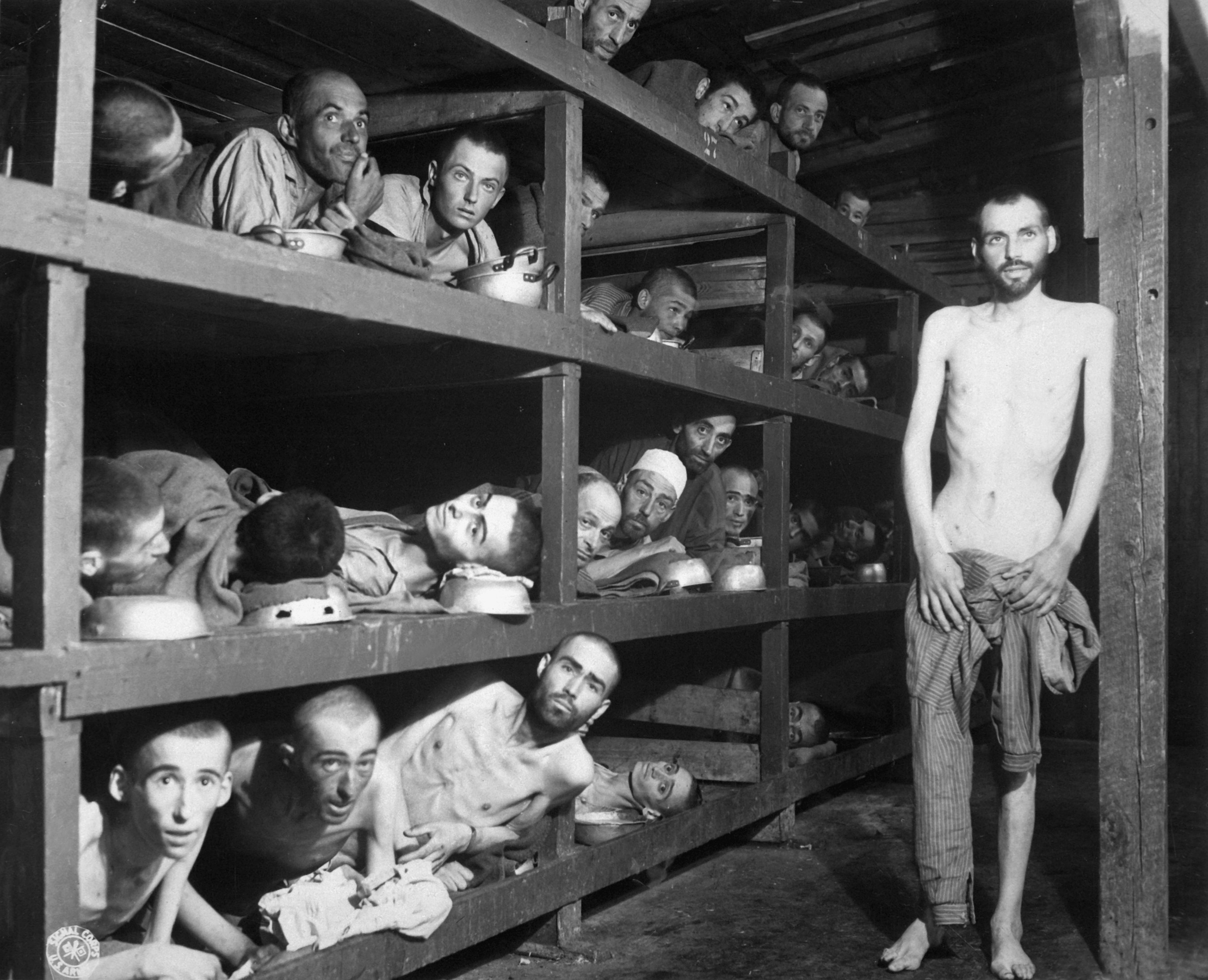
An image displayed in the Historical Museum of Serbia, claiming to be “the example of living conditions of Goli otok prisoners.” This image is actually of survivors of the Nazi Buchenwald concentration camp, including Elie Wiesel.

The Historical Museum of Serbia put on the highly publicized exhibition "In the Name of the People – Political Repression in Serbia 1944–1953", which according to Subotić "promised to display new historical documents and evidence of communist crimes, ranging from assassinations, kidnappings and detentions in camps to collectivization, political trials and repression" but actually showed "random and completely decontextualized photographs of 'victims of communism', which included innocent people but also many proven fascist collaborators, members of the quisling government, right-wing militias, and the Axis-allied Chetnik movement."

Another example is the well-known photograph of prisoners from the Buchenwald concentration camp, which was displayed in the section devoted to a Communist-era camp for political prisoners on the Adriatic island of Goli Otok, describing it as "the example of living conditions of Goli Otok prisoners", and not correcting it after the misrepresentation was exposed. After an outcry from Holocaust historians, a small note was taped underneath the display caption that read: "Prisoners' bunk-beds in the Dachau camp." According to Subotić, this form of revisionism "has become so mainstream and state sponsored that in 2018 Croatian president Kolinda Grabar-Kitarović called for the creation of an international commission to determine the truth about the camp between 1941 and 1945, 'but also after'—indicating that the narrative that Jasenovac was a communist camp after the war was now accepted at the pinnacle of power."

== See also ==
- Anti-communism
- Black Ribbon Day
- Comparison of Nazism and Stalinism
- Genocide recognition politics
- Holocaust trivialization
- Prague Declaration
- The Seventy Years Declaration
- Żydokomuna

== Bibliography ==
- Blutinger, Jeffrey (Fall 2010). "An Inconvenient Past: Post-Communist Holocaust Memorialization". Shofar. 29 (1). Purdue University Press: 73–94. doi:10.1353/sho.2010.0093. JSTOR 10.5703/shofar.29.1.73. S2CID 144954562.
- Budryté, Dovilé (2004). "'We Call it Genocide': Soviet Deportations and Repression in the Memory of Lithuanians". In Frey, Robert Seitz (ed.). The Genocidal Temptation: Auschwitz, Hiroshima, Rwanda, and Beyond. University Press of America. ISBN 978-0-7618-2743-6.
- Florian, Alexandru, ed. (2018). Holocaust Public Memory in Postcommunist Romania. Studies in Antisemitism. Indiana University Press. doi:10.2307/j.ctt2050vp3. ISBN 978-0-253-03274-4. JSTOR j.ctt2050vp3. OCLC 1002302967.
- Hoxha, Ani (December 2015). "Holocaust Revisionism and Obfuscation: The Notion of 'Double-Genocide' and the Lithuanian Government's Instrumentalisation of Timothy Snyder's 'Bloodlands'" (PDF). Teaching History. 49 (4): 36–41.
- Huterer, Andrea; Venclova, Tomas (January 2011). "Ich ersticke: Litauen auf nationalistischen Irrwegen". Osteuropa. 61 (1): 97–109. ISSN 0030-6428. JSTOR 44936946.
- Katz, Dovid (November 2016). "Is Eastern European 'Double Genocide' Revisionism Reaching Museums?". Dapim: Studies on the Holocaust. 30 (3): 191–220. doi:10.1080/23256249.2016.1242043. S2CID 157910635.
- Katz, Dovid (December 2017). "The Extraordinary Recent History of Holocaust Studies in Lithuania". Dapim: Studies on the Holocaust. 31 (3): 285–295. doi:10.1080/23256249.2017.1395530. S2CID 165297779.
- Leggewie, Claus (2013). "Totalitarian Experience and European Memory". Belgrade Journal of Media and Communications. 2 (3): 101–106. ISSN 2334-6132. CEEOL 149749.
- Malinauskaite, Gintare (8–9 November 2013). Holocaust Memory and Antisemitism in Lithuania: Reversed Memories of the Second World War (PDF). Jewish Museum Berlin.
- Mälksoo, Maria (March 2014). "Criminalizing Communism: Transnational Mnemopolitics in Europe" (PDF). International Political Sociology. 8 (1): 82–99. doi:10.1111/ips.12041.
- Radonić, Ljiljana (November 2018). "From 'Double Genocide' to 'the New Jews': Holocaust, Genocide and Mass Violence in Post-Communist Memorial Museums". Journal of Genocide Research. 20 (4): 510–529. doi:10.1080/14623528.2018.1522831. S2CID 80720034.
- Rosenfeld, Alvin Hirsch (2013). The End of the Holocaust. Indiana University Press. ISBN 978-0-253-01197-8.
- Vanagaitė, Rūta; Zuroff, Efraim (2020). Our People: Discovering Lithuania's Hidden Holocaust. Rowman & Littlefield. ISBN 978-1-5381-3303-3.
- Voicu, George (2015). "Post-Communist Romania's Leading Public Intellectuals and the Holocaust". Holocaust. Studii şi cercetări. VII (8): 281–306. ISSN 2065-6602. CEEOL 415363.
- Wight, A. Craig (July 2016). "Lithuanian Genocide Heritage as Discursive Formation". Annals of Tourism Research. 59: 60–78. doi:10.1016/j.annals.2016.04.002. hdl:10026.1/4673.
- Zombory, Máté (November 2017). "The Birth of the Memory of Communism: Memorial Museums in Europe". Nationalities Papers. 45 (6): 1028–1046. doi:10.1080/00905992.2017.1339680.
