= Holocaust trivialization =

Inappropriate comparisons or analogies that trivialize the Holocaust

Holocaust trivialization is the act of making comparisons that diminish the scale and severity of the atrocities committed by Nazi Germany. The Wiesel Commission defines trivialization as the abusive use of comparisons with the aim of minimizing the Holocaust and banalizing its atrocities.

Manfred Gerstenfeld identifies trivialization of the Holocaust as one of eleven forms of Holocaust distortion; he defines Holocaust trivialization as the application of language that is specific to describing the Holocaust to events and purposes that are unrelated to it. According to Gerstenfeld, such unrelated issues include environmental problems, abortion, killing of animals, tobacco consumption, and human rights abuses. According to David Rudrum, examples of Holocaust trivialization include Lord Wigley invoking Auschwitz to oppose nuclear weapons and Al Gore citing Kristallnacht in defence of the environment.

German political scientist Clemens Heni writes: "Contrary to the hard-core version, soft-core denial is often not easily identifiable. Often it is tolerated, or even encouraged and reproduced in the mainstream, not only in Germany. Scholars have only recently begun to unravel this disturbing phenomenon. Manfred Gerstenfeld discusses Holocaust trivialization in an article published in 2008. In Germany in 2007 two scholars, Thorsten Eitz and Georg Stötzel, published a voluminous dictionary of German language and discourse regarding National Socialism and the Holocaust. It includes chapters on Holocaust trivialization and contrived comparisons, such as the infamous 'atomic Holocaust', 'Babycaust,' 'Holocaust of abortion', 'red Holocaust' or 'biological Holocaust.'"

The Holocaust survivor and memoirist Elie Wiesel wrote, "I cannot use [the word Holocaust] anymore. First, because there are no words, and also because it has become so trivialized that I cannot use it anymore. Whatever mishap occurs now, they call it 'holocaust.' I have seen it myself in television in the country in which I live. A commentator describing the defeat of a sports team, somewhere, called it a 'holocaust.' I have read in a very prestigious newspaper published in California, a description of the murder of six people, and the author called it a holocaust. So, I have no words anymore."

== Notable cases and incidents ==
=== Communism and the Soviet Union ===
A report by the Wiesel Commission criticized the comparison of Gulag victims with Jewish Holocaust victims, as was done in The Black Book of Communism, as an attempt at Holocaust trivialization.

==== Double genocide theory ====
The double genocide narrative holds that there were two contemporary genocides of equal weight, a Nazi one and a Stalinist one. Michael Shafir calls the double genocide theory a form of Holocaust obfuscation, while Carole Lemée sees it as a symptom of persistent antisemitism.

In The Holocaust/Genocide Template in Eastern Europe, Ljiljana Radonić writes that the double genocide theory proposes the existence of an equivalency between communism and Nazism. Radonić posits that this theory and charges of Communist genocide both come from "a stable of anti-communist émigré lexicon since the 1950s and more recently revisionist politicians and scholars" as well as the "comparative trivialization" of the Holocaust that "results from tossing postwar killings of suspected Axis collaborators and opponents of Tito's regime into the same conceptual framework as the Nazi murder of six million of Jews", describing this as "an effort to demonize communism more broadly as an ideology akin to Nazism".

During the Historikerstreit, many scholars believed the position taken in the Holocaust uniqueness debate by conservative intellectuals led by Ernst Nolte – namely that the Holocaust was not unique, Germans should not bear any special burden of guilt for the "Final Solution to the Jewish Question", there was no moral difference between the crimes of the Soviet Union and those of Nazi Germany, as the Nazis acted as they did out of fear of what the Soviet Union might do to Germany, or that the Holocaust itself was a reaction to the Bolshevik Revolution and the Soviet Union—trivialized the Holocaust, and echoed Nazi propaganda. The German historian Thomas Kühne writes that "[t]he more provocative historians were in doing so and the more they thereby questioned the uniqueness, or the peculiarity, of the Holocaust, the more their work was met with resistance or even disgust, most prominently and controversially the German Ernst Nolte in the 1980s."

==== Red Holocaust ====
The term red Holocaust was coined by the Institute of Contemporary History (Munich Institut für Zeitgeschichte) at Munich. According to the German historian Jörg Hackmann, this term is not popular among scholars in Germany or internationally. Alexandra Laignel-Lavastine writes that usage of this term "allows the reality it describes to immediately attain, in the Western mind, a status equal to that of the extermination of the Jews by the Nazi regime." Michael Shafir says that the use of the term supports the "competitive martyrdom component" of the double genocide theory. George Voicu states that Leon Volovici has "rightfully condemned the abusive use of this concept as an attempt to 'usurp' and undermine a symbol specific to the history of European Jews."

=== COVID-19 pandemic responses ===
In May 2021, in response to the anti-vaccine movement in the United States, hatWRKS, a hat store in Nashville, Tennessee, sold badges that resembled the yellow stars Jews were forced to wear during the Holocaust with the words "Not vaccinated" on them. Protestors rallied outside the store, and Stetson announced they would no longer sell hats to the store. The practice of wearing yellow stars in protests against responses to the COVID-19 pandemic spread to cities like Montreal, London, Amsterdam and Paris. This was condemned by various Jewish advocacy groups and Holocaust survivors, being described as a trivialization of the Holocaust.

=== Israeli–Palestinian conflict ===
Academics worldwide have debated whether comparisons between Israel and Nazi Germany are inherently antisemitic or not. Lesley Klaff and Bernard-Henri Lévy argue that comparing Israel to the Nazis lacks historical and moral equivalence, and risks inciting anti-Jewish sentiment. Historian Bernard Lewis suggests that the belief that the Nazis were no worse than Israel also provides "welcome relief to many who had long borne a burden of guilt for the role which they, their families, their nations, or their churches had played in Hitler's crimes against the Jews, whether by participation or complicity, acquiescence or indifference".

The Working Definition of Antisemitism – adopted by the International Holocaust Remembrance Alliance, the U.S. Department of State, and other organizations – offers several examples to help determine when criticism of Israel may be antisemitic, including "drawing comparison of contemporary Israeli policy to that of the Nazis". Critics of the definition say that it equates legitimate criticisms of Israel with antisemitism and that it has been used to censor pro-Palestinian activism, in particular. Journalist M. Gessen has also noted "One could also argue that the inherent conflation of Jews with the state of Israel is antisemitic, even that it meets the I.H.R.A. definition of antisemitism." Alternative definitions such as the Jerusalem Declaration on Antisemitism have been proposed instead on this basis.

According to political scientist Ian Lustick, a professor at the University of Pennsylvania, such comparisons are "a natural if unintended consequence of the immersion of Israeli Jews in Holocaust imagery". British scholar David Feldman suggests that comparisons in relation to the 2014 Gaza War were not motivated by a broader anti-Jewish subjectivity but by targeted criticism of Israeli policy in military actions.

In Austria, while overt antisemitism has been limited following the Holocaust, the Freedom Party of Austria has used comparisons between Nazi Germany and Israel to delegitimize its political opponents. In Israel, Lustick reports that many Israelis are "already repelled by actions against Palestinians they cannot help but associate with Nazi persecution of Jews". Israeli-American historian Omer Bartov has drawn an analogy between the German army's dehumanization of its enemies under Nazism and the attitudes displayed by young Israeli soldiers in the 2023 Gaza war.

==== Incidents ====
During a visit to Berlin in 2022, Palestinian President Mahmoud Abbas told Olaf Scholz that "Israel [had] committed….50 massacres, 50 slaughters, 50 holocausts" after he was inquired if he would apologize for the Munich massacre by Palestinian terrorists. Scholz stated in a message to the Bild newspaper that "for us Germans, any relativization of the Holocaust is unbearable and unacceptable."

On 14 April 2026, during a debate in the Sejm, Konrad Berkowicz, the vice-chairman of KORWiN, aka 'The New Hope', a far-right party displayed an Israeli flag in which the Star of David was replaced with a swastika. During his speech, he referred to Israel as a "new Third Reich", accused it of committing genocide in Gaza, and war crimes "with particular cruelty", including the use of white phosphorus in Gaza and Lebanon. Israel as well as the European Jewish Congress strongly condemned Berkowicz's actions, calling them "antisemitic horror," "Holocaust inversion" and an "antisemitic provocation." Włodzimierz Czarzasty, Deputy Speaker of the Polish parliament, said that Berkowitz's actions were "in no way justified."

On 11 July 2026, during a pro-Palestinian demonstration in Stockholm, protesters carried a replica of the entrance gate to Auschwitz with the word "Gaza" replacing the original title "Arbeit macht frei". The display was criticised as trivializing the Holocaust and led to public controversy and a police investigation of hate crime that was dropped.

=== Social media ===
Some trends on social media platforms have trivialized the Holocaust. In 2020, teenagers posted on TikTok videos of themselves dressed in Holocaust-themed fancy dress, and TikTok banned the hashtag Holocaustchallenge.

=== Russian invasion of Ukraine ===
Yad Vashem criticized the Kremlin's claim that the Russian invasion of Ukraine was aimed at the "denazification" of Ukraine, as false and a trivialization of Holocaust history. According to the philosopher Jason Stanley, this reflects an antisemitic conspiracy theory which casts Russian Christians, rather than Jews, as the true victims of Nazi Germany. The Fortunoff Archive for Holocaust Testimonies also condemned the invasion and described Putin's rhetoric as Holocaust trivialization, and the US Holocaust Memorial Museum denounced Putin's characterization of Holocaust history.

On 21 March 2022, Ukrainian president Volodymyr Zelenskyy was criticized by Yad Vashem for creating what the organisation said was a false equivalence between the Russian invasion and the Holocaust, while Israeli Prime Minister Naftali Bennett found the comparison of the two events to be inappropriate.

== See also ==
- AIDS–Holocaust metaphor
- Armenian genocide and the Holocaust
- Fascist (insult)
- Comparisons between Israel and Nazi Germany
- Genocide denial
- Genocide recognition politics
- Genocide studies
- Genocides in history
- Godwin's law
- Historical negationism
- Historical revisionism
- History of the Jews during World War II
- Holocaust denial
- The Holocaust Industry
- Holocaust inversion
- Holocaust studies
- Islamophobic trope
- Israeli apartheid
- Is the Holocaust Unique?
- Holocaust uniqueness debate
- Link between the Herero genocide and the Holocaust
- The Holocaust and the Nakba

== Sources ==
- Lustick, Ian S. (2019). Paradigm Lost: From Two-State Solution to One-State Reality. University of Pennsylvania Press. ISBN 978-0-8122-5195-1.
- Rosenfeld, Alvin H. (9 January 2019). Anti-Zionism and Antisemitism: The Dynamics of Delegitimization. Indiana University Press. ISBN 978-0-253-03872-2.
