= The Seventy Years Declaration =

The Seventy Years Declaration was a declaration initiated by the American academic Dovid Katz and the Australian academic Danny Ben-Moshe, and released on 20 January 2012 to protest the policies of several European states and European Union bodies concerning the evaluation, remembrance and prosecution of crimes committed by communist dictatorships in Europe, specifically policies of many European countries and the EU treating the Nazi and Stalinist regimes in Eastern and Central Europe as equally criminal. Presented as a response to the Prague Declaration on European Conscience and Communism initiated by the Czech government in 2008 to condemn communism as totalitarian and criminal, it explicitly rejects the idea that the regimes of Joseph Stalin and Adolf Hitler are morally equivalent, i.e. the totalitarianism theory that was popularized by academics such as Hannah Arendt, Carl Friedrich and Zbigniew Brzezinski and became dominant in Western political discourse during the Cold War, and that gained new popularity in many new EU member states after the end of communism, resulting in international resolutions, establishment of research institutes and museums, and the European Day of Remembrance for Victims of Stalinism and Nazism. The declaration also states that communist regimes did not commit genocides, citing the 1948 Genocide Convention which restricts genocide to mass killings related to ethnicity, race, nationality, or religion. The declaration claims that the Holocaust was unique, a subject of some debate. The declaration was signed by 70, mostly leftist, parliamentarians from Europe (MEPs and national MPs). It was released on the 70th anniversary of the Wannsee Conference in Berlin.

== Background ==
=== The Prague Declaration and the totalitarianism paradigm ===
During the Cold War, the theory of two totalitarianisms, fascism and communism, gained popularity in the Western world, for example through the work of Hannah Arendt (notably her influential book The Origins of Totalitarianism) and other scholars, such as Carl Friedrich and Zbigniew Brzezinski, who argued that Nazi and Soviet regimes were equally totalitarian. According to Volker Berghahn, "as Carl J. Friedrich and Zbigniew Brzezinski later put it in their classic analysis of the totalitarian paradigm that came to sweep the board in Western ideological discourse in the 1950s, Nazism and Stalinism were "basically alike" and represented very modern and brutally destructive versions of twentieth-century dictatorship."

Since the end of the Cold War, eastern and central European countries have established institutes and enacted laws to address crimes committed by former totalitarian regimes in their countries, both communist and fascist. Examples include the Czech state Institute for the Study of Totalitarian Regimes, the Polish state Institute of National Remembrance, the Lithuanian state Genocide and Resistance Research Centre of Lithuania, the German state Hannah Arendt Institute for the Research on Totalitarianism and the Hungarian state House of Terror museum. The theory of two totalitarianisms also gained new popularity in the West during the 1990s, especially after the publication of the 1997 French book The Black Book of Communism, which said that "the genocide of a "class" may well be tantamount to the genocide of a "race,"" arguing that deaths caused by Hitler's and Stalin's regimes were "equal". In its introduction, Stéphane Courtois argued that communism and national socialism are slightly different totalitarian systems, that communism is responsible for the murder of about 100 million people during the 20th century, that the National Socialists adopted their repressive methods from Soviet methods, and that "a single-minded focus on the Jewish genocide in an attempt to characterize the Holocaust as a unique atrocity has [...] prevented the assessment of other episodes of comparable magnitude in the Communist world". The United States Congress claimed in 1993 that 100,000,000 victims died in "an unprecedented imperial communist holocaust," establishing the Victims of Communism Memorial Foundation.

An increased emphasis on the crimes of communism after the end of communism resulted in the 2006 Council of Europe resolution 1481, which condemned the "individual and collective assassinations and executions, death in concentration camps, starvation, deportations, torture, slave labour and other forms of mass physical terror" perpetrated by communist regimes, and in early 2008, the European Union initiated the European Public Hearing on Crimes Committed by Totalitarian Regimes. In mid-2008, the Czech government initiated the Prague Declaration on European Conscience and Communism, signed by Václav Havel, Joachim Gauck, and others. It endorsed the idea of "Europe-wide condemnation of, and education about, the crimes of communism." As proposed by the declaration, the European Parliament in 2008–2009 with approval of all political factions designated the European Day of Remembrance for Victims of Stalinism and Nazism as "a Europe-wide Day of Remembrance for the victims of all totalitarian and authoritarian regimes, to be commemorated with dignity and impartiality," and a remembrance day for victims of totalitarian regimes was also adopted by Canada. In 2009, the European Parliament endorsed the recognition of "Communism, Nazism and fascism as a shared legacy," reconfirmed "its united stand against all totalitarian rule from whatever ideological background," and condemned "strongly and unequivocally all crimes against humanity and the massive human rights violations committed by all totalitarian and authoritarian regimes." The remembrance day was endorsed by the Parliamentary Assembly of the Organization for Security and Co-operation in Europe in its 2009 Vilnius Declaration, which said that "in the twentieth century European countries experienced two major totalitarian regimes, Nazi and Stalinist, which brought about genocide, violations of human rights and freedoms, war crimes and crimes against humanity" and condemned "the glorification of the totalitarian regimes, including the holding of public demonstrations glorifying the Nazi or Stalinist past." The European Parliament and the Council of the European Union also endorsed the establishment of the Platform of European Memory and Conscience, as conceived by the Prague Declaration, by the governments of the Visegrád Group, the Polish EU presidency and several European state institutes, as an EU educational project to increase awareness about totalitarian crimes and to "prevent intolerance, extremism, anti-democratic movements and the recurrence of any totalitarian rule in the future." The Greens–European Free Alliance argued that "the Prague Declaration on European Conscience and Communism should be the common basis for the research on and evaluation of communist regimes in all countries in East-Europe."

The Prague Declaration was opposed by Russian bodies and organisations affiliated with Vladimir Putin's government, such as the Presidential Commission of the Russian Federation to Counter Attempts to Falsify History to the Detriment of Russia's Interests and World Without Nazism. It was also opposed by several European communist parties, such as the Communist Party of Greece and the Communist Party of Britain. There were isolated critiques of the Prague Declaration in 2009 by (in chronological order of appearance in print): Dovid Katz, formerly professor of Yiddish at Vilnius University, who founded the web journal Defending History in part to oppose the Prague Declaration; Israeli activist Efraim Zuroff, director of the Simon Wiesenthal Center's Israel office; British MP John Mann, who termed it a "sinister document", Anti-German political scientist Clemens Heni, and others. The Prague Declaration was also criticised by eurosceptic John Laughland, who has instead compared the EU to Nazism. However, there has also been support for the Prague Declaration from Israeli academics such as Barry Rubin and Lithuanian centrist politician Emanuelis Zingeris, a former honorary chairman of that country's Jewish community.

=== Response by the Seventy Years Declaration ===
By the initiative of Katz, Danny Ben-Moshe drafted the Seventy Years Declaration as a response to the Prague Declaration. Seventy members of the European Parliament from 19 EU countries signed it on 20 January 2012, to mark the seventieth anniversary of the 1942 Wannsee Conference in Berlin that had decided on the "Final Solution" (genocide) of European Jewry.

The text of the Seventy Years Declaration was published on 20 January 2012 in Defending History, and subsequently in European languages. Its distribution was reported by Roger Cohen in the New York Times, Danna Harman in Haaretz, Frank Brendle in Taz.de, among others. In 2013, its own website was launched. The Declaration forms part of the subject material of the documentary movie Rewriting History, which premiered on Australian television in September 2012.

The Seventy Years Declaration condemns Stalinist tyranny and proposes distinct, separate recognition of the various European tragedies of the 20th century. The SYD explicitly rejects the Prague Declaration and its "attempts to obfuscate the Holocaust by diminishing its uniqueness and deeming it to be equal, similar or equivalent to Communism."

The Declaration also opposes various alleged East European attempts to glorify Nazi collaborator organisations, specifically mentioning the honouring of the Waffen SS in Estonia and Latvia, and the Lithuanian Activist Front in Lithuania. It acknowledges the need to honour Jewish partisans who joined the battle against Hitler, a reference to Lithuanian government efforts to prosecute Holocaust Survivors who joined the resistance. The Declaration opposes attempts to extend the definition of "genocide" to encompass sundry crimes of totalitarian regimes, endorsing instead a strict definition in the spirit of the 1948 definition.

The Seventy Years Declaration was presented to Martin Schulz, president of the European Parliament, on 14 March 2012.

== Response ==
Israeli academic Barry Rubin has written, referring to the initiators of the Seventy Years Declaration, that "a relentless campaign has been waged by a tiny group of people to persuade Jews and Israelis to oppose the June 3, 2008 Prague Declaration on European Conscience and Communism, as if it were some horrible anti-Semitic document. This is a slanderously wrong claim."

The Seventy Years Declaration was criticized by the Lithuanian foreign minister Audronius Ažubalis, who said in response that "It is not possible to find differences between Hitler and Stalin except in their moustaches (Hitler's was shorter)." The response came in anger at the fact that eight Lithuanian Social Democrats (two MEPs and six MPs) signed the Declaration. A heated debate ensued when a subsequent article by Ažubalis was replied to by MP Vytenis Povilas Andriukaitis, then an opposition spokesman on foreign affairs. The foreign minister's "moustache comparison" resulted in individual letters of praise from British MP Denis MacShane to each of the eight Lithuanian signatories, and to reportage in the New York Times.
