= Steven Rosefielde =

Professor of comparative economic systems (born 1942)

- Born: 1942 (age 83–84)
- Education: Harvard University
- Scientific career
- Fields: Russian, Soviet and Communist studies, comparative economic systems and international security
- Workplaces: University of North Carolina at Chapel Hill

Steven R. Rosefielde (born 1942) is professor of comparative economic systems at the University of North Carolina at Chapel Hill. He is also a member of the Russian Academy of Natural Sciences.

== Red Holocaust ==
In Red Holocaust, Rosefielde's main point is that communism in general, although he focuses mostly on Stalinism, is less genocidal, and that is a key distinction from Nazism. According to German historian Jörg Hackmann, the term is not popular among scholars in Germany or internationally. Alexandra Laignel-Lavastine writes that usage of this term "allows the reality it describes to immediately attain, in the Western mind, a status equal to that of the extermination of the Jews by the Nazi regime." Michael Shafir writes that the use of the term supports the "competitive martyrdom component of Double Genocide", a theory whose worst version is Holocaust obfuscation. George Voicu states that Leon Volovici has "rightfully condemned the abusive use of this concept as an attempt to 'usurp' and undermine a symbol specific to the history of European Jews."

== Work, reviews and citations ==
In a 2001 study, Rosefielde calculated that there were 3.4 million premature deaths in Russia from 1990 to 1998, partly blaming on the shock therapy that came with the Washington Consensus. Rosefielde's work has been reviewed in peer-reviewed journals. Russia since 1980: Wrestling with Westernization was reviewed by David G. Rowley in History: Reviews of New Books. Red Holocaust was reviewed by Martin Kragh in Scandinavian Economic History Review. As of 2020, "Measuring Enterprise Efficiency in the Soviet Union: A Stochastic Frontier Analysis" has been cited 82 times.

== Selected works ==
- Steven Rosefielde; Jonathan Leightner (19 September 2017). China's Market Communism: Challenges, Dilemmas, Solutions. Taylor & Francis. ISBN 978-1138125230.
- Russia since 1980: Wrestling with Westernization, with Stefan Hedlund, Cambridge University Press, 2009
- Red Holocaust, Routledge, 2009
- Economic Welfare and the Economics of Soviet Socialism: Essays in Honor of Abram Bergson, Cambridge University Press, 2008
- The Russian Economy: From Lenin to Putin, Wiley-Blackwell, 2007
- Masters of Illusion: American Leadership In The Media Age, Cambridge University Press, 2006
- Comparative Economic Systems: Culture, Wealth, and Power in the 21st Century, Wiley-Blackwell, 2002, 2005, 2008
- Russia in the 21st Century: The Prodigal Superpower, Cambridge University Press, 2004
- Premature Deaths: Russia's Radical Economic Transition in Soviet Perspective, Europe-Asia Studies (2001). 53 (8): 1159–1176. doi:10.1080/09668130120093174.
- Efficiency and Russia's Economic Recovery Potential to the Year 2000 and Beyond, ed., Ashgate Publishing, 1998
- Documented Homicides and Excess Deaths: New Insights into the Scale of Killing in the USSR during the 1930s. (PDF file) Communist and Post-Communist Studies, Vol. 30, No. 3, pp. 321–333. University of California, 1997.
- False Science: Underestimating the Soviet Arms Buildup. An Appraisal of the CIA's Direct Costing Effort, 1960–1985, 1988
- World Communism at the Crossroads: Military Ascendancy, Political Economy, and Human Welfare, 1980
- Soviet International Trade in Heckscher-Ohlin Perspective: An Input-Output Study, 1973
