= Danny Ben-Moshe =

Australian academic and filmmaker

Danny Ben-Moshe is a documentary filmmaker, author and former academic. He has produced and directed several documentary films.

== Career ==
In 2001, Ben-Moshe received the Commonwealth Centenary Medal for his work in education and research on racism in Australia.

Ben-Moshe established Identity Films and Productions in Melbourne in 2006. His documentary The Buchenwald Ball that same year, followed Holocaust survivors in Australia commemorating the sixtieth anniversary of their liberation and was screened on SBS Television.

=== Documentary and Film ===
In 2014, Ben-Moshe and Dan Goldberg won the Walkley Documentary Award for Code of Silence, a documentary about child sexual abuse in Melbourne’s Orthodox Jewish community.

His 2010 film The End of the Rainbow was screened on ABC Television in Australia, and was about a week in the life of The Rainbow Hotel, an iconic live music venue in Melbourne, and how community spaces and cultural heritage are threatened by property development.

His 2011 documentary Carnaby Street Undressed was broadcast on the Yesterday Television channel in the UK, was named "Pick of the Week" in The Sunday Times & London’s Time Out awarded it 4 stars.

In 2012, Ben-Moshe co-produced, co-directed and was the lead catalyst in the documentary Rewriting History about the emergence of Double Genocide and the rewriting of the history of the Holocaust in Lithuania. It received critical acclaim from The Australian newspaper. It was initially screened on SBS Television in Australia.

In 2017, Ben-Moshe wrote, produced and directed the documentary Shalom Bollywood: The Untold Story of Jews and India's Bollywood. In 2018, Ben-Moshe wrote and directed Outback Rabbis for SBS.

In 2019, Ben-Moshe produced and directed the virtual-reality documentary Walk With Me,which follows a Holocaust survivor retracing their wartime experiences and is on permanent exhibition at the Melbourne Holocaust Museum.His later VR work has included testimonial films with survivors of the 7 October 2023 Hamas attack on Israel.

His 2020 work included producing Covisions: Young Global Voices in the Time of Corona, while Yom Kippur in Lockdown was broadcast by ABC.

Ben-Moshe produced and directed Revenge: Our Dad the Nazi Killer in 2023.The following year, he wrote and directed the virtual-reality production Survived to Tell.

In 2026, he produced and directed Cancelled for News 24 in Australia.

Ben-Moshe’s films have been broadcast internationally on networks including BBC, ABC, YES, PBS and NHK. His films have also been screened at Tate Modern in London and the Knesset in Jerusalem.

In January 2026, HarperCollins Australia published his first novel, The Watchmaker’s War. The novel was inspired by the story explored in his 2023 documentary Revenge: Our Dad the Nazi Killer.

== Filmography ==
Released Films

Year	Film	Role	Notes
2006	The Buchenwald Ball	Co-director and Co-producer	SBS Television
2010	The End of the Rainbow	Writer, Director and Producer	ABC Television
2011	Carnaby Street Undressed	Writer, Co-director and Co-producer	Yesterday
2012	Rewriting History	Co-director, Co-producer, Key protagonist, Cast	SBS Television
2014	Code of Silence	—	—
2017	Shalom Bollywood	Writer, Director and Producer	—
2017	My Mother’s Lost Children	Writer and Director	BBC Four
2018	Outback Rabbis	Writer and Director	SBS
2019	Walk With Me (VR)	Producer and Director	Melbourne Holocaust Museum
2019	China’s Artful Dissident	—	ABC
2020	Covisions: Young Global Voices in the Time of Corona	Producer	Doc Edge New Zealand
2020	Yom Kippur in Lockdown	—	ABC
2023	Revenge: Our Dad the Nazi Killer	Producer and Director	ABC; BBC; NRK Norway; DR Denmark
2024	Survived to Tell (VR)	Writer and Director	IsraelIs NGO
2026	Cancelled	Producer and Director	News 24 (Australia)

=== Academia and Publications ===
Before becoming a full-time filmmaker, Ben-Moshe spent more than a decade as an academic at Deakin University and Victoria University in Melbourne. His research included cultural diversity, diaspora, antisemitism and Jewish identity. He is the co-author of the book Israel, the Diaspora and Jewish Identity and his major study on comparative diasporas in Australia was launched at Parliament House in the Australian Capital in 2012.

Ben-Moshe has also written for newspapers and magazines including The Age, The Australian, The Canberra Times, and The Jerusalem Post. He is the co-author with Dovid Katz of The Seventy Years Declaration on the Final Solution Conference at Wannsee, He has also written on Holocaust denial and the Double Genocide theory in Lithuania and elsewhere.

=== Podcast ===
Ben-Moshe is also the producer and presenter of the Audible podcast series My Lost Family, which is based on his own family history. CrimeReads included the series in its selection of seven international true-crime podcasts.

== Selected publications ==
=== Media articles ===
- "Modern migrant's loyalty is an asset to the world". The Age. 26 February 2013.
- Saying no to double genocide, The Jerusalem Post, 3 March 2012
- Lithuania Assaults Holocaust Memory, The Jerusalem Report, 7 November 2011
- Lithuania Obfuscates the Holocaust, The Jerusalem Report, 4 July 2011
- In India, Coexistence Won’t be Murdered, The Jerusalem Report, 22 December 2008
- A Progressive Zionist Dilemma, The Jerusalem Report, 15 February 2010

=== Publications ===
- Ben-Moshe, Danny (2005), "Holocaust Denial in Australia", Analysis of Current Trends in Antisemitism, 25, The Vidal Sassoon International Center for the Study of Antisemitism, pp. 2–49
- Ben-Moshe, Danny (2001), "One Nation and the Australian far right", Patterns of Prejudice Volume 35, Issue3, Routledge, pp. 24–40
- Ben-Moshe, Danny (1996), "The Demidenko/Darville Controversy", Without Prejudice

=== Book chapters ===
- Ben-Moshe, Danny (2004), "Holocaust Denial", Contemporary Reflections on the Holocaust, Prager Greenwood, pp. 139–176
- Ben-Moshe, Danny (2004), "Australian Holocaust Denial", in Wistrich, Robert (ed.), Lying about the Holocaust, University of Nebraska Press, pp. 139–176
- Ben-Moshe, Danny (2009), "Israel and the Australian Jewish Vote", in Brahm Levey, G; Mendes, P (eds.), Jews and Australian Politics, Sussex Academic Press, pp. 127–142, ISBN 978-1-85109-873-6
- Ben-Moshe, Danny (2006), "The End of Unconditional Love: the Future of Zionism in Australian Jewish Life", in Landau, M; Wolski, N; Fagenblat, M (eds.), New Under the Sun: Jewish Life in Australia, Black Inc, pp. 108–125

=== Books ===
- The Diaspora and Jewish Identity, Coeditor, Sussex Academic Press, 2007.

=== Journal articles ===
- Ben-Moshe, Danny (2012), "The Place of Israel and Jewish Peoplehood in Jewish Education in the Diaspora: An Australian Case Study", in Chamo, Nurit; Dror, Yuval (eds.), Paths in pluralistic Jewish education, Tel Aviv. School of Education, Tel Aviv University, Ramot Publishing and MOFET, pp. 165–204
- Ben-Moshe, Danny (2010), "The Nature and Extent of Israeli Films in Diaspora Jewish Film Festivals.", Association for Israel Studies, 26th Annual Conference, University of Toronto
- Ben-Moshe, Danny (2009), "Jewish Diaspora Engagement with Israel", in Ehrlich, M. Avrum (Mark Avrum) (ed.), Encyclopedia of the Jewish Diaspora: Origins, Experiences, and Culture, Volume 1, Santa Barbara, Calif.: ABC-CLIO, pp. 340–345, ISBN 978-1-85109-873-6
- Ben-Moshe, Danny (2004), "The Impact of the Al-Aqsa Intifada on Israel-Diaspora Relations", Israel Studies Forum. Vol. 19. No. 3., Berghahn Journals
- Ben-Moshe, Danny (2004), "Post-Zionism in the Oslo era and the implications for the diaspora.", Israel Affairs 10.1-2., pp. 313–336

=== Non-Academic Publications ===
- Ben-Moshe, Danny (1993), "Australia's Grim Fairy Tales", in Bar-Ilan, David (ed.), Eye on The Media, Jerusalem Post
- Danny Ben-Moshe; Joanne Pyke (August 2012). Diasporas in Australia : current and potential links with the homeland. Summary report of an Australian Research Council Linkage project into the Italian, Macedonian, Tongan and Vietnamese diasporas (Report). Centre for Citizenship and Globalisation, Deakin University.
- Danny Ben-Moshe; Joanne Pyke; Ordan Andreevski (August 2012). The Macedonian Diaspora in Australia : current and potential links to the homeland. Report of an Australian Research Council linkage project (Report). Centre for Citizenship and Globalisation, Deakin University.
- Danny Ben-Moshe; Joanne Pyke (August 2012). The Vietnamese Diaspora in Australia : current and potential links to the homeland. Report of an Australian Research Council linkage project (Report). Centre for Citizenship and Globalisation, Deakin University.
- Danny Ben-Moshe; Joanne Pyke; Loretta Baldassar (August 2012). The Italian Diaspora in Australia : current and potential links to the homeland. Report of an Australian Research Council linkage project (Report). Centre for Citizenship and Globalisation, Deakin University.
- Danny Ben-Moshe; Joanne Pyke; Steve Francis (August 2012). The Tongan Diaspora in Australia : current and potential links to the homeland. Report of an Australian Research Council linkage project (Report). Centre for Citizenship and Globalisation, Deakin University.
- Hurriyet Babacan; Danny Ben-Moshe (August 2008). Multicultural Affairs in Victoria: a discussion paper for a new policy (Report). Victorian Multicultural Commission.
