= Declaration on Crimes of Communism =

The Declaration on Crimes of Communism is a declaration signed on 25 February 2010 by several prominent European politicians, former political prisoners, human rights advocates and historians, which calls for the condemnation of communism.

== Creation ==
It concluded the international conference Crimes of the Communist Regimes, that took place at the Czech Senate and the Office of the Government of the Czech Republic from 24 to 26 February 2010. The declaration reiterated many of the suggestions set forth by the Prague Declaration on European Conscience and Communism.

=== Hosts ===
The conference was hosted by Jiří Liška, Vice President of the Czech Senate, and the Office of the Government of the Czech Republic, and organized by the Institute for the Study of Totalitarian Regimes under the patronage of Jan Fischer, Prime Minister of the Czech Republic, Heidi Hautala, Chairwoman of the Human Rights Subcommittee of the European Parliament, Göran Lindblad, Vice President of the Parliamentary Assembly of the Council of Europe, among others. The cooperation partners included the Konrad Adenauer Foundation, the Information Office of the European Parliament, the Representation of the European Commission in the Czech Republic, the Robert Schuman Foundation of the European People's Party, the Polish Institute in Prague, the Federal Commissioner for the Stasi Records and the National Endowment for Democracy.

== Content ==
The declaration both called for condemnation of communism, education about communist crimes, prosecution of communist criminals by establishing an international court within the EU for communist crimes, construction of a memorial to the victims of world communism, and reduction of pensions and social security benefits for communist perpetrators. The declaration stated that:

- "Communist regimes have committed, and are in some cases still committing, crimes against humanity in all countries of Central and Eastern Europe and in other countries where communism is still alive"
- "Crimes against humanity are not subject to statutory limitations according to international law; however, the justice done to perpetrators of Communist crimes over the past 20 years has been extremely unsatisfactory"
- "We must not deny the tens of millions of victims of Communism their right to justice"
- "Since crimes against humanity committed by the communist regimes do not fall under the jurisdiction of existing international courts, we call for the creation of a new international court with a seat within the EU for the crimes of communism. Communist crimes against humanity must be condemned by this court in a similar way as the Nazi crimes were condemned and sentenced by the Nuremberg tribunal, and as the crimes committed in former Yugoslavia were condemned and sentenced"
- "Not punishing the communist criminals means disregard of and thus weakening of international law"
- "As an act of reparation and restitution, European countries must introduce legislation that equalizes the pensions and social security benefits of perpetrators of communist crimes so that they are equal to or smaller than those of their victims"
- "As democracy must learn to be capable of defending itself, Communism needs to be condemned in a similar way as Nazism was. We are not equating the respective crimes of Nazism and Communism, including the Gulag, the Laogai and the Nazi concentration camps. They should each be studied and judged on their own terrible merits. Communist ideology and communist rule contradict the European Convention of Human Rights and the Charter of Fundamental Rights of the EU. Just as we are not willing to relativise crimes of Nazism, we must not accept a relativisation of crimes of Communism."
- "We call upon EU member states to increase the awareness raising and education about crimes of communism; we remind them of the need to implement, without further delay, the Resolution of the European Parliament (2 April 2009) to mark 23 August as the European-wide Day of Remembrance of the victims of all totalitarian and authoritarian regimes."
- "We call upon the European Commission and European Council of Justice and Home Affairs to adopt a Framework Decision introducing a pan-European ban on excusing, denying or trivializing the crimes of communism."
- "The creation of the Platform of European Memory and Conscience, as supported by the European Parliament and the EU Council in 2009, must be completed at EU level. Individual governments must live up to their commitments regarding the work of the Platform."
- "As an act of recognition of the victims and respect for the immense suffering inflicted upon half of the continent, Europe must erect a memorial to the victims of world Communism, following the example of the memorial in the USA in Washington, D.C."

== Signatories ==
The signatories included:

- Jiří Liška, Vice President of the Czech Senate
- Harry Wu, human rights activist
- Nikita V. Petrov, Vice Chairman of Memorial
- Heidi Hautala, Chairwoman of the Human Rights Subcommittee, European Parliament
- Ivana Janů, Justice of the Constitutional Court, former judge of the International Criminal Tribunal for the former Yugoslavia
- Joachim Gauck, former Federal Commissioner for the Stasi Records
- Vytautas Landsbergis, former President of Lithuania
- Göran Lindblad, Vice President of the Parliamentary Assembly of the Council of Europe
- Hubert Gehring, Director of the Konrad Adenauer Foundation in Prague
- Naděžda Kavalírová, Chairwoman of the Confederation of Political Prisoners of the Czech Republic

== See also ==
- Prague Declaration on European Conscience and Communism
- European Day of Remembrance for Victims of Stalinism and Nazism
- Council of Europe resolution 1481
- European Public Hearing on Crimes Committed by Totalitarian Regimes
- Vilnius Declaration
- Act on Lawlessness of the Communist Regime and on Resistance Against It
