= Council of Europe resolution 1481 =

2006 resolution by the Council of Europe

In the resolution 1481/2006 of the Council of Europe Parliamentary Assembly (PACE) issued on 25 January 2006 during its winter session, the Council of Europe "strongly condemns crimes of totalitarian communist regimes".

It condemned "the massive human rights violations committed by totalitarian communist regimes and expressed sympathy, understanding and recognition for the victims of these crimes". It also said these violations "included individual and collective assassinations and executions, death in concentration camps, starvation, deportations, torture, slave labour and other forms of mass physical terror".

The full draft recommendation by rapporteur Göran Lindblad was issued with great majority by the Political Affairs committee. However, it did not receive the necessary two-thirds majority of the votes cast in the Parliamentary Assembly. The group of communist parties, plus United Russia, strongly opposed the resolution. The resolution was supported by the most conservatives including EPP/CD, ED, liberal groups and some social democrats, especially from countries like Hungary, the Czech Republic or the Baltic countries.

== Final voting results ==
- 153 members were present and voted out of 317
- 99 members voted in favor of the Resolution 1481
- 42 members voted against the Resolution 1481
- 12 members abstained from voting

== See also ==
- European Day of Remembrance for Victims of Stalinism and Nazism
- European Public Hearing on Crimes Committed by Totalitarian Regimes
- Declaration on Crimes of Communism
- Prague Declaration on European Conscience and Communism
- Vilnius Declaration
