= Jiří Liška (politician) =

Czech politician (1949–2025)

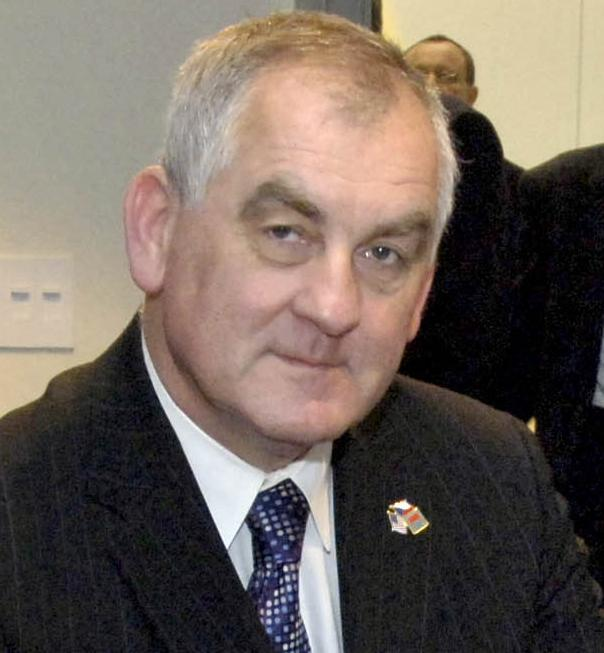
Liška in 2007

Jiří Liška (12 May 1949 – 1 March 2025) was a Czech politician. He was a onetime Vice-President of the Czech Senate.

== Background ==
Liška was born on 12 May 1949. He graduated from the University of Veterinary Sciences Brno in 1974.

Liška was married to Zuzana Lišková. They had two sons, Petr and Jan. He died on 1 March 2025, at the age of 75.

== Career ==
During the Velvet Revolution, he worked as veterinarian in Prague, Tábor and Jičín. In 1990, he was appointed temporary chairman of the Civic National Committee of Jičín. In 1992, already a member of the Civic Democratic Party, he was elected to the Federal Assembly of Czechoslovakia that was dissolved following the breakup of Czechoslovakia in 1993.

In 1994–2002 he served as the mayor of Jičín. Liška was first elected to the Senate of the Czech Republic in 1996, and was reelected in 1998 and 2004 in the Jičín district. Among his functions in the Senate, most notable are the chairmanship of the Civic Democratic Party caucus and Vicepresidency of the Senate.

He was a founding signatory of the Prague Declaration on European Conscience and Communism as well as the Declaration on Crimes of Communism.
