= European Public Hearing on Crimes Committed by Totalitarian Regimes =

Crimes Committed by Totalitarian Regimes are reports and proceedings of the European public hearing organised by the Slovenian Presidency of the Council of the European Union (January–June 2008) and the European Commission. The Hearing was organised in response to the request made by the Justice and Home Affairs Council of the European Union on 19 April 2007.

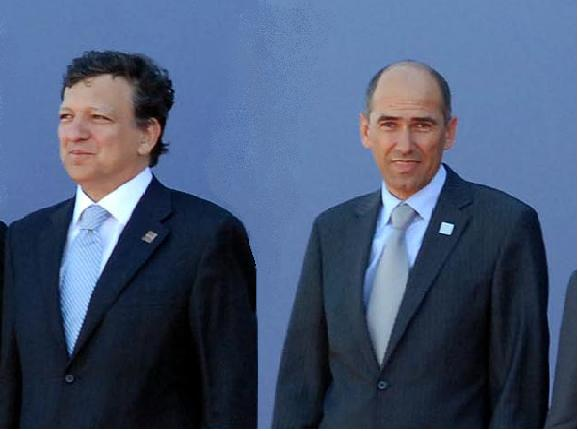
The president of the EU Commission, José Manuel Durão Barroso and the Slovenian Prime Minister, Janez Janša, in 2007.

Edited by Peter Jambrek and published by the Slovenian Presidency of the Council of the European Union Crimes, the reports and proceedings research and investigate gross and large scale human rights violations committed during the reign of totalitarian regimes in Europe.

There were four sessions at the Hearing:

- How to improve knowledge about totalitarian crimes?
- How to promote public awareness about totalitarian crimes?
- What lessons can be drawn from successful experiences?
- How to achieve reconciliation?

The preface was written by the Slovenian Minister of Justice Lovro Šturm, and the introduction by Jacques Barrot, Vice-President of the European Commission for Justice, Freedom and Security. Countries that were involved were: Estonia, Lithuania, Romania, Slovenia, Poland and Spain.

== Topics and chapters ==
I. HISTORY, CHARACTERISTICS AND CLASSIFICATION OF TOTALITARIAN REGIMES

- Historical justice for Europe: why, when and how?
- Suggestions on assessment of totalitarian communism.
- The making of the communist regime in Slovenia and Yugoslavia.
- Totalitarian regimes in Slovenia in the 20th century.
- Characteristics of the judicial system in Slovenia between 1945 and 1951.
- The Roman Catholic Church in Slovenia under three totalitarian regimes.
- The need for equal treatment of Nazi and Soviet crimes.
- Hypocrisy of discrimination among victims of totalitarian crimes.

II. TOTALITARIAN CRIMES: CROSS-NATIONAL SURVEY

- Crimes committed in Latvia by the occupation regimes of the USSR and Germany (1940–90).
- Political repression in the 1940s and 1950s in Estonia.
- Lithuanian victims of communist occupation.
- Poland – the victim of two totalitarian regimes.
- The Securitate legacy – terror in Romania.
- A topic doomed to oblivion: foreign prisoners in Soviet custody – with special regard to the fate of Hungarian civilian internees.
- Repression over the Slovenian people by the German Nazism.
- Crimes committed by the Fascist regime in the Slovene territory.
- Totalitarian features of the judiciary in the Republic of Slovenia (1945–90).
- Concentration and labour camps in Slovenia.
- Secret World War II mass graves in Slovenia
- Communist repression of "interior enemies" in Slovenia.

III. TRANSITIONAL JUSTICE: PROSECUTION AND REDRESS Of INJUSTICE

- Reparation and reconciliation in international law: the view of an Estonian lawyer.
- Prosecution of Nazi and Communist crimes in Poland.
- On rehabilitation and remedy measures in Bulgaria for persons repressed from 1944 through 1989.
- Transitional justice in Spain.
- Communist repression and transitional justice in Slovenia.
- Post-World War II crimes on the territory of Slovenia: police investigation and proof regarding criminal offences that do not fall under the statute of limitations.
- About ideologies, institutions and death.

IV. REMEMBRANCE, RECOGNITION AND PUBLIC AWARENESS Of TOTALITARIAN

V. RECONCILIATION: ON HANDLING THE TRAUMATIC PAST

== Totalitarian machines ==
The report stated the following about Totalitarian machines:

Let us mention briefly Fascism, National Socialism and Titoism in Italy, Austria and Slovenia. Three Christian nations, with nationalist tendencies, were infected with totalitarianism. The descent into barbarism has comparable structural elements:

- Abuse of national sentiment to carry out racial and class revolutionary projects;
- Cult of a great leader, who permits his fanatics to murder, steal and lie;
- Dictatorship of one party;
- Militarisation of society, police state – almighty secret political police;
- Collectivism, subjection of the citizen to the totalitarian state;
- State terrorism with systematic abuses of basic human rights;
- Aggressive assumption of power and struggle for territory.

== Remembrance day ==
The European Parliament has proposed August 23 as a common remembrance day of Victims of Totalitarian Regimes.

== See also ==
- Totalitarianism
- European Day of Remembrance for Victims of Stalinism and Nazism
- Council of Europe resolution 1481
- Prague Declaration on European Conscience and Communism
- Declaration on Crimes of Communism
- Vilnius Declaration
