= European Parliament resolution of 19 September 2019 on the importance of European remembrance for the future of Europe =

European Union legislative resolution

The importance of European remembrance for the future of Europe

European Parliament
- Territorial extent: European Union
- Enacted by: 19 September 2019
- Voting summary: 535 voted for; 66 voted against; 52 abstained; 98 absent

Summary
- Emphasize the importance of European remembrance by condemning all totalitarian ideologies

The European Parliament resolution of 19 September 2019 on the importance of European remembrance for the future of Europe was a resolution of the European Parliament adopted on 19 September 2019 with 535 votes in favor, 66 against, and 52 abstentions, which called for remembrance of totalitarian crimes and condemned propaganda that denies or glorifies totalitarian crimes, and linked such propaganda to Russian information warfare against "democratic Europe."

== Content and background ==
The resolution stated that "the Nazi and communist regimes carried out mass murders, genocide and deportations and caused a loss of life and freedom in the 20th century on a scale unseen in human history." It condemned Russian state "propaganda [that continues] to whitewash communist crimes and glorify the Soviet totalitarian regime" and condemned "the current Russian leadership [for distorting] historical facts and [whitewashing] crimes committed by the Soviet totalitarian regime", which the resolution described as an "information war waged against democratic Europe." The resolution stressed that there is "an urgent need to raise awareness, carry out moral assessments and conduct legal inquiries into the crimes of Stalinism and other dictatorships", called on "Russian society to come to terms with its tragic past", condemned the Molotov–Ribbentrop Pact and highlighted the importance of the European Day of Remembrance for the Victims of Stalinism and Nazism. The resolution also expressed concern over the "use of symbols of totalitarian regimes in the public sphere" and called for the removal of monuments and memorials "glorifying totalitarian regimes."

The importance of European remembrance for the future of Europe (European Parliament)
Ballot →	19 September 2019
Required majority →	327 out of 653
Yes: • EPP (155); • S&D (120); • Renew (100); • ECR (56); • Greens/EFA (52); • ID (49); • NA (3)	535 / 653
No: • The Left (31); • NA (26); • S&D (6); • Greens/EFA (2); • EPP (1)	66 / 653
Abstention: • ID (16); • NA (13); • Greens/EFA (12); • S&D (3); • EPP (3); • The Left (2); • ECR (2); • Renew (1)	52 / 653
Not voting: • S&D (25); • EPP (23); • NA (15); • The Left (8); • ID (8); • Greens/EFA (8); • Renew (7); • ECR (4)	98 / 751
Result →	Approved

== Voting ==
The resolution was sponsored by the European People's Party group, the Progressive Alliance of Socialists and Democrats group, the liberal Renew Europe group and the European Conservatives and Reformists group. The resolution is considered part of the emergence of an anti-communist political culture in the European Union. Russia reacted strongly to the resolution, with President Vladimir Putin calling it "absolutely unacceptable." The Guardian noted that the resolution "came after a concerted effort from the Russian foreign ministry earlier [in 2019] to rehabilitate the 1939 Nazi-Soviet non-aggression pact." In 2020, the foreign ministers of Bulgaria, the Czech Republic, Estonia, Hungary, Latvia, Lithuania, Poland, Romania, Slovakia and the United States accused Putin of falsifying history.

== See also ==
- Presidential Commission of the Russian Federation to Counter Attempts to Falsify History to the Detriment of Russia's Interests
- Propaganda in the Russian Federation
- Russian web brigades
