= Ljiljana Radonić =

Croatian political scientist (born 1981)

Ljiljana Radonić (born 1981) is a Croatian political scientist from Vienna. Since 2019, she is leading the five-year project financed by a European Research Council consolidator grant through the "Globalized Memorial Museums. Exhibiting Atrocities in the Era of Claims for Moral Universals" at the Austrian Academy of Sciences, of which she is a Junge Akademie member. She graduated (PhD) in 2009 at the University of Vienna, and has been a lecturer at the university's Department of Political Science since 2004.

Radonić is the editor of The Holocaust/Genocide Template in Eastern Europe, a 2020 book published by Routledge.
