= Michael Shafir =

Romanian–Israeli political scientist (1944–2022)

Michael Shafir (Hebrew: מייקל שפיר; 4 January 1944 – 9 November 2022) was a Romanian–Israeli political scientist. He has been described as "one of the leading analysts of antisemitism and the treatment of the Holocaust in east-central Europe".

== Biography ==
Shafir was born in Bucharest, Romania. He immigrated to Israel during the Communist period in Eastern Europe, later returning to Romania in 2005. From then until his retirement he taught at the Faculty of European Studies of Babeș-Bolyai University, in Cluj-Napoca; in 2012 he donated his collection to the Octavian Goga Cluj County Library, despite the library being named for Goga, a radical antisemite.

Shafir died on 9 November 2022, at the age of 78.

== Works ==
- Shafir, Michael (1985). Romania, Politics, Economics, and Society: Political Stagnation and Simulated Change. L. Rienner Publishers. ISBN 978-0-931477-02-7.
- Shafir, Michael (2002). Between Denial and "comparative Trivialization": Holocaust Negationism in Post-communist East Central Europe. Hebrew University of Jerusalem, Vidal Sassoon International Center for the Study of Antisemitism.
