= Thomas Kühne =

German historian (born 1958)

- Born: 1958 (age 67–68); Cologne, North Rhine-Westphalia, West Germany
- Occupation: Historian

Academic background
- Education: Bielefeld University
- Alma mater: University of Tübingen
- Thesis: Dreiklassenwahlrecht und Wahlkultur in Preussen 1867-1914 (1992)

Academic work
- Discipline: History
- Sub-discipline: Genocide studies, Holocaust history
- Institutions: Clark University
- Doctoral students: Kimberly Partee Allar, Cristina Andriani, Mayaan Armelin, Michael Geheran, Hana Green, Sandra Grudic Gabrielle Hauth, Emil Kjerte, Jody Russell Manning, Mihai Poliec, Jason Tingler
- Website: Thomas Kühne publications on Academia.edu

Thomas Kühne (born 1958, in Cologne) is a German-American historian. He holds the Strassler Colin Flug Chair for the Study of Holocaust History at the Strassler Center for Holocaust and Genocide studies Genocide Studies at Clark University in Worcester, Massachusetts. His research and teaching focus on genocides and wars in modern European history, especially on Holocaust perpetrators and bystanders; he also engages in the study of masculinity and body aesthetics.

== Biography ==
Kühne trained in Germany and received his Ph.D. from the University of Tübingen in 1992. He held teaching and research positions at the Universities of Konstanz, Bielefeld, Tübingen, and Weingarten before moving to the U.S. in 2003. A member of the history faculty at Clark University since 2004, he contributed to the development of the doctoral program run by the Strassler Center for Holocaust and Genocide Studies. As director of graduate studies, he convened the first in a series of international doctoral student conferences in 2009.

In his research, Kühne has covered three fields: political culture of Imperial Germany; male bonding and mass violence in the twentieth-century; and body aesthetics in global history. His awards include the German Bundestag Prize in the Study of Parliamentary Affairs (1995), two sabbatical grants from the German Research Foundation DFG (1998, 2001), and most notably, fellowships from the John Simon Guggenheim Memorial Foundation (2010) and the Institute for Advanced Study in Princeton (2003, 2010).

Kühne has written about his family’s silence regarding their wartime lives as he was growing up in post-war Germany and what he eventually learned about his parents' experiences with Nazism. His father was drafted into the Wehrmacht in 1943 and survived Soviet captivity. His mother, born in Poland to an ethnic German family sympathetic to Nazi ideology, joined a Nazi youth group, the Bund deutscher Mädel.

Kühne served as director of the Strassler Center from 2016 until May 2026. In the announcement regarding his departure as director, Clark University provost John Magee acknowledged the broader context of "challenge and heightened visibility for scholars and centers working in Holocaust and Genocide Studies." Under Kühne's leadership, the Strassler Center attracted negative attention regarding antisemitism and antizionism.

== Political culture of Imperial Germany ==
Kühne's early work inquired into the political culture of Prussia, the hegemonic federal state of Imperial Germany (1867-1918). His dissertation, published in 1994 as Dreiklassenwahlrecht und Wahlkultur in Preussen 1867-1914 [transl. Three-Class Voting System and Electoral Culture in Prussia, 1867-1914] and praised as a milestone in party and election history, elucidates why the Prussian three-class electoral law in Wilhelmine Germany, which even in its time was condemned as socially unjust, could survive for half a century, despite all signs pointing to mass politicization. As the book shows, the three-class electoral law built on and reinforced age-old political traditions, producing a quiescent political culture that was widely appreciated in the Prussian countryside still in 1900.

== Collective identity and the Holocaust ==
In the mid-1990s, Kühne's research foci shifted to the history of war, genocide and masculinities in the 20th Century. Taking up strands of previously established Anglophone scholarship, his volume on men's history in modern Germany (Männergeschichte-Geschlechtergeschichte, 1996) established this field in Central Europe and stimulated a broad range of innovative studies. Covering the period from 1918 to 1995, the monograph Kameradschaft (2006) asks how the myth of comradeship prefigured and shaped the war experience of Hitler's soldiers and war memory in Germany through the end of the century. [1] Kühne's first book published in English goes further by encompassing the entire German society rather than only the soldiers. Belonging and Genocide. Hitler's Community, 1918-1945 (Yale University Press, 2010) shows how the longing for community, the practice of togetherness, and the ethos of comradeship became the basis of mass murder- how an advanced civilian society became a genocidal society. The argument of the book-that "the Holocaust provided Germans with a particular sense of national belonging, " and that "the German nation found itself by committing the Holocaust"- has yielded endorsement as well as criticism.[2]

== Body aesthetics in modern global history ==
In his current research, Kühne has also contributed to the history of body aesthetics. His co-edited volume Globalizing Beauty. Body Aesthetics in the 20th Century (2013) links issues of self and society, body culture and visual culture, regional particularities and globalization and provides an interdisciplinary prolegomena to future inquiries into how and why modern societies struggle for beauty.

== Selected works ==
=== In German ===
- Kühne, Thomas (1994). Dreiklassenwahlrecht und Wahlkultur in Preußen 1867-1914. Landtagswahlen zwischen korporativer Tradition und politischem Massenmarkt, Düsseldorf: Droste.
- Kühne, Thomas (1994). Handbuch der Wahlen zum Preußischen Abgeordnetenhaus 1867-1918. Wahlergebnisse, Wahlbündnisse und Wahlkandidaten, Düsseldorff: Droste, 1994
- Kühne, Thomas (1996). Männergeschichte - Geschlechtergeschichte. Männlichkeit im Wandel der Moderne, Frankfurt: Campus.
- Kühne, Thomas; Ziemann, Benjamin (2000). Was ist Militärgeschichte? Paderborn: Schöningh.
- Kühne, Thomas (2006). Kameradschaft. Die Soldaten des nationalsozialistischen Krieges und das 20. Jahrhundert, Göttingen: Vandenhoeck & Ruprecht.

=== In English ===
- Kühne, Thomas (2010). Belonging and Genocide. Hitler's Community, 1918-1945. New Haven: Yale University Press.
- Berghoff, Hartmut; Kühne, Thomas (2013): Globalizing Beauty. Body Aesthetics in the 20th Century. Houndmills: Palgrave-Macmillan.
- Kühne, Thomas (2017). The Rise and Fall of Comradeship: Hitler's Soldiers, Male Bonding and Mass Violence in the Twentieth Century. Cambridge University Press.
