= Black Ribbon Day =

International day of remembrance

- Observed by: European Union, Organization for Security and Co-operation in Europe, Canada, United States and other countries
- Type: International
- Significance: Day of remembrance for the victims of totalitarian and authoritarian regimes
- Date: August 23
- Next time: 23 August 2027
- Frequency: Annual

The Black Ribbon Day, officially known in the European Union as the European Day of Remembrance for Victims of Stalinism and Nazism and also referred to as the Europe-wide Day of Remembrance for the victims of all totalitarian and authoritarian regimes, is an international day of remembrance for victims of totalitarianism regimes, specifically Stalinist, communist, Nazi and fascist regimes. Formally recognised by the European Union, the Organization for Security and Co-operation in Europe and some other countries, it is observed on 23 August. It symbolises the rejection of "extremism, intolerance and oppression" according to the European Union. The purpose of the Day of Remembrance is to preserve the memory of the victims of mass deportations and exterminations, while promoting democratic values to reinforce peace and stability in Europe. It is one of the two official remembrance days or observances of the European Union, alongside Europe Day. Under the name Black Ribbon Day it is an official remembrance day of Canada. The European Union has used both names alongside each other.

The remembrance day has its origins in Cold War-era protests in Western countries against the Soviet Union, which gained prominence in the years leading up to the Revolutions of 1989 and that inspired the 1989 Baltic Way, a major demonstration where two million people joined their hands to call for an end to the Soviet occupation. Canadian and other Western communities of refugees from the Soviet Union were instrumental in establishing the remembrance day in 1986. It was proposed as an official European remembrance day by Václav Havel, Joachim Gauck and a group of human rights activists and former political prisoners from Central and Eastern Europe during a conference organised by the Czech Government, and was formally designated by the European Parliament in 2008/2009 as "a Europe-wide Day of Remembrance for the victims of all authoritarian and totalitarian regimes, to be commemorated with dignity and impartiality"; it has been observed annually by the institutions of the European Union since 2009. The European Parliament's 2009 resolution on European conscience and totalitarianism, co-sponsored by the European People's Party, the Alliance of Liberals and Democrats for Europe, The Greens–European Free Alliance, and the Union for Europe of the Nations, called for its implementation in all of Europe. The establishment of 23 August as an international remembrance day for victims of totalitarianism was also supported by the 2009 Vilnius Declaration of the OSCE Parliamentary Assembly.

23 August was chosen to coincide with the date of the signing of the Molotov–Ribbentrop Pact, a 1939 non-aggression pact between the Soviet Union and Nazi Germany which contained a protocol dividing Romania, Poland, the Baltic states, and Finland into designated Soviet and German spheres of influence. The treaty was described by the European Parliament's president Jerzy Buzek in 2010 as "the collusion of the two worst forms of totalitarianism in the history of humanity." The remembrance day is part of a common European response to Russian disinformation that seeks to deny Soviet war crimes and other atrocities and justify Soviet invasions and occupations. Vladimir Putin's Russian government has attacked it for its condemnation of Stalinism. In a 2019 resolution, the European Parliament described the date of 23 August as important in pushing back against a Russian "information war waged against democratic Europe." In 2022 European Commission President Ursula von der Leyen highlighted the remembrance day's importance in standing against "Russia's illegal and unjustified war against Ukraine."

== History ==
=== Revolutions of 1989 ===
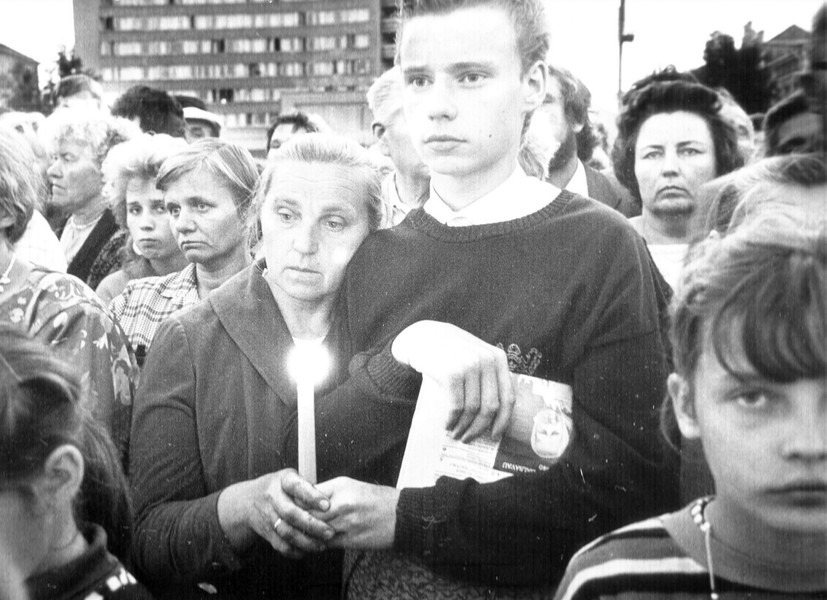
Lithuanians protesting against the Soviet occupation in Panevėžys during the Baltic Way on Black Ribbon Day in 1989

Both the date of 23 August as a remembrance day and the name "Black Ribbon Day" originated in protests held in western countries against the Soviet Union in the 1980s, which gained prominence in the years leading up to the Revolutions of 1989.

Canadian and other Western communities of refugees from the Soviet Union were instrumental in establishing Black Ribbon Day as "a day of protest against the Soviet Union" during the Cold War in 1986. Markus Hess of the Estonian Central Council in Canada, the later chairman of the Central and Eastern European Council of Canada, proposed the name Black Ribbon Day and the concept of using black ribbons as a form of protest in 1985. He gathered representatives of affected communities and formed the International Black Ribbon Day Committee. David Somerville's idea of using the anniversary of the signing of the Molotov Ribbentrop Pact as Black Ribbon Day was accepted by the committee in February 1986. The committee launched its campaign for the first Black Ribbon Day by organising committees in 21 cities worldwide. Television commercials describing the Molotov Ribbentrop Pact and its secret protocols and aftermath were broadcast nationally in Canada. On 23 August 1986, Black Ribbon Day demonstrations were held in 21 western cities, including New York City, Ottawa, London, Stockholm, Seattle, Los Angeles, Perth, Australia, and Washington, DC. The demonstrations were coordinated by the International Black Ribbon Day Committee, which opened up offices in Toronto. Markus Hess was elected president and David Somerville was elected vice president of the International Black Ribbon Day Committee. Under their leadership, the movement expanded annually and by 1991, demonstrations were held in 56 cities.

In 1987, Black Ribbon Day protests spread to the Baltic countries and culminated in the Baltic Way in 1989, a historical event during the revolutions of 1989. Two million people joined their hands to form a human chain, to protest against the continued Soviet occupation.

=== Proclamation by the European Parliament, support from the OSCE and official adoption in national legislation ===
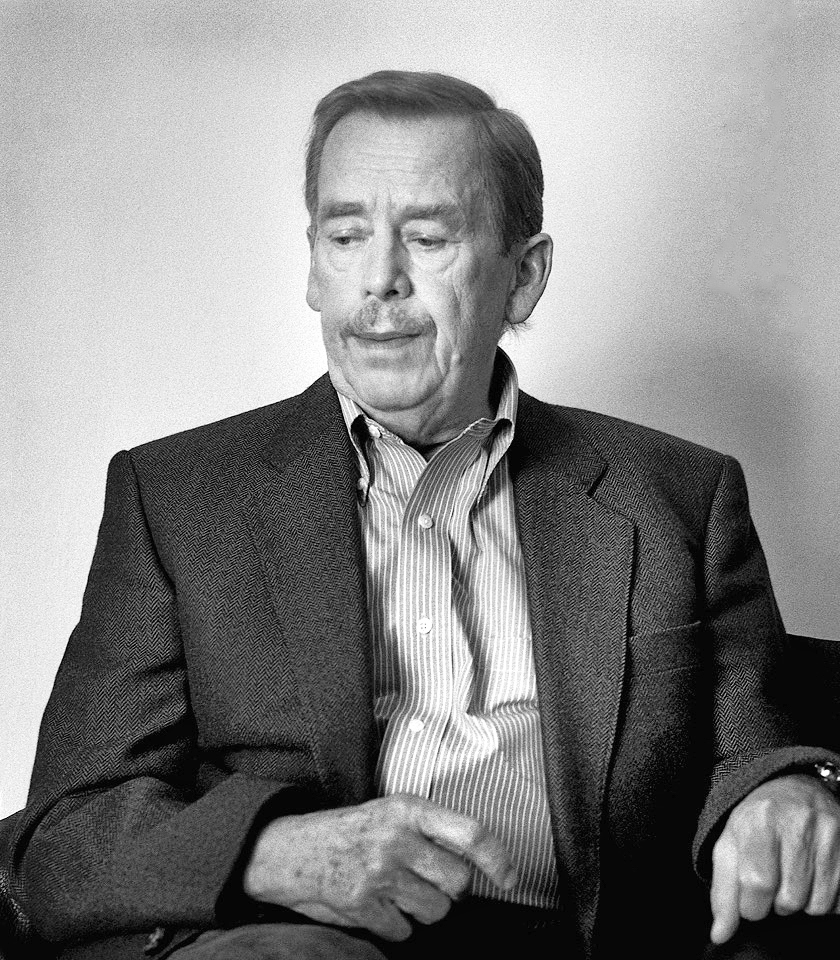
The establishment of the European Day of Remembrance for Victims of Stalinism and Nazism was proposed by Václav Havel (pictured), Joachim Gauck and a group of human rights activists and former political prisoners from Central and Eastern Europe.

The European Public Hearing on Crimes Committed by Totalitarian Regimes was organised by the Slovenian Presidency of the Council of the European Union and the European Commission in April 2008. It aimed at improving knowledge and public awareness about totalitarian crimes.

The date of 23 August was adopted as an official day of remembrance for victims of totalitarianism by international bodies and various countries after it was proposed by the 2008 Prague Declaration, initiated by the Czech government and signed by (among others) Václav Havel, Joachim Gauck, Vytautas Landsbergis, Emanuelis Zingeris, and Łukasz Kamiński on 3 June 2008. The declaration concluded the conference European Conscience and Communism. This international conference took place at the Czech Senate from 2 to 3 June 2008, hosted by the Senate Committee on Education, Science, Culture, Human Rights and Petitions, under the auspices of Alexandr Vondra, Deputy Prime Minister of the Czech Republic for European Affairs.

On 23 September 2008, 409 members of the European Parliament signed a declaration on the proclamation of 23 August as European Day of Remembrance for Victims of Stalinism and Nazism. The declaration pointed out: "The mass deportations, murders, kleptocracies and enslavements committed in the context of the acts of aggression by Stalinism and Nazism fall into the category of war crimes and crimes against humanity. Under international law, statutory limitations do not apply to war crimes and crimes against humanity."

On 2 April 2009, a resolution of the European Parliament on European conscience and totalitarianism, calling, among other things, on its member states and other European countries to implement the European Day of Remembrance for Victims of Stalinism and Nazism, was passed by a vote of 533–44 with 33 abstentions.

On 3 July 2009, the Organization for Security and Co-operation in Europe (OSCE) adopted the Vilnius Declaration, which supported 23 August as the international remembrance day for Victims of totalitarianism and urged its member states to increase awareness of totalitarian crimes. The resolution, which was adopted nearly unanimously, stated that Europe had "experienced two major totalitarian regimes, Nazi and Stalinist, which brought about genocide, violations of human rights and freedoms, war crimes and crimes against humanity," urged all OSCE members to take a "united stand against all totalitarian rule from whatever ideological background" and condemned "the glorification of the totalitarian regimes, including the holding of public demonstrations glorifying the Nazi or Stalinist past."

After the European Parliament had proclaimed the European Day of Remembrance for Victims of Stalinism and Nazism, the president of the European Parliament, Hans-Gert Pöttering, highlighted the insufficient attention given to Soviet totalitarianism and Soviet war crimes, and thanked the governments of Lithuania, Latvia and Estonia for their efforts to better inform Western Europe. Pöttering brought up the classic study on totalitarianism by Hannah Arendt, which developed "the scientific basis criteria to describe totalitarianism", concluding that "both totalitarian systems (Stalinism and Nazism) are comparable and terrible", Pöttering said. Joseph Daul, chairman of the European People's Party group, stated:

2009 is a deeply symbolic year, since we celebrate both the 60th anniversary of the creation of NATO and the beginnings of the cold war, and the 20th anniversary of the fall of the Berlin Wall, which ended it. This is why we have proposed to launch a Europe-wide day of remembrance which will help Europe reconcile its totalitarian legacy, both from the Nazis and the Communists.

In December 2010, the foreign ministers of six EU member states affected by communist occupation and dictatorship called upon the European Commission to make "the approval, denial or belittling of communist crimes" an EU-wide criminal offence. "Alongside the prosecution and punishment of criminals, the denial of every international crime should be treated according to the same standards, to prevent favourable conditions for the rehabilitation and rebirth of totalitarian ideologies," the foreign ministers wrote. Czech Foreign Minister Karel Schwarzenberg compared the denial of communist crimes to the denial of Nazi crimes and said, "there is a fundamental concern here that totalitarian systems be measured by the same standard."

On 10 June 2011, the EU Justice and Home Affairs Council, that is, the justice and home affairs ministers of all EU Member States, adopted conclusions stating, among other things, that it reaffirmed "the importance of raising awareness of the crimes committed by totalitarian regimes, of promoting a shared memory of these crimes across the Union and underlining the significant role that this can play in preventing the rehabilitation or rebirth of totalitarian ideologies," and highlighted "the Europe-wide Day of Remembrance of the victims of the totalitarian regimes (23 August)," inviting "Members States to consider how to commemorate it."

On 23 August 2011, the Polish Presidency of the European Union organised a conference on the occasion of the European Day of Remembrance for the Victims of Totalitarian Regimes. The EU presidency cited the Justice and Home Affairs Council conclusions of 10 June and the EU's Stockholm Programme, which emphasises that "remembrance of shared history is necessary to understand contemporary Europe." European officials adopted the Warsaw Declaration for the European Day of Remembrance for the Victims of Totalitarian Regimes. The Warsaw Declaration vows that the suffering of victims of totalitarian regimes "will not sink into oblivion." The declaration states that "crimes of totalitarian regimes in Europe should be acknowledged and condemned, regardless of their type and ideology." Justice Minister Krzysztof Kwiatkowski said that the "Warsaw Declaration is a unanimous agreement of all EU member states that we have to do everything we can to prevent any totalitarian regime from reviving in all the countries making up one big European family." EU Justice Commissioner Viviane Reding stated on this occasion:

Totalitarian regimes are the denial of human dignity and the violation of all fundamental rights of our societies built upon democracy and the respect of the rule of law. We must offer the victims of those crimes, and their family members, sympathy, understanding and recognition of their suffering. Every victim of any totalitarian regime has the same human dignity and deserves justice, remembrance and recognition by all of us.

On 23 August 2014, EU justice commissioner Martine Reicherts emphasised that the Molotov–Ribbentrop Pact "of Nazi Germany under Hitler and the Soviet Union under Stalin would pave the way for the most brutal war to this day, leading to many years of fear, horror and pain for the victims of these regimes," stating that the Europe-wide Day of Remembrance for the victims of all totalitarian and authoritarian regimes is a reminder that we must not take "dignity, freedom, democracy, the rule of law and human rights" for granted, and that "peace, democracy and fundamental rights are not a given. We have to defend them, every day of the year."

In 2017 the Estonian EU Presidency hosted the International Conference on the European Day of Remembrance for Victims of Communism and Nazism in Tallinn, where the remembrance day was observed by all the ministers of justice of the European Union.

On the occasion of the European Day of Remembrance for Victims of Stalinism and Nazism in 2018, eight EU countries signed a joint statement on "the continued investigation of crimes committed by the communist regime via national law enforcement agencies and the intensification of transnational cooperation in this area."

The governments of Poland, Romania, Latvia, Lithuania and Estonia released a joint statement in 2019 that called upon "the governments of all European countries to provide both moral and material support to the ongoing historical investigation of the totalitarian regimes. By acting in a concerted manner, we can counter more effectively disinformation campaigns and attempts to manipulate historical facts. We must stand together against totalitarianism." David Sassoli, the president of the European Parliament, noted on 23 August 2019 that "on this remembrance day our minds turn to the victims of Nazism and Stalinism as the past is never really dead and we do not forget the dark night of totalitarianism. In this memory we find the strength and value of the peace and prosperity our Union has brought."

=== 2020 commemoration and Freedom Way protest in support of democracy in Belarus ===
On Black Ribbon Day in 2020, around 50,000 people joined hands in a human chain called the Freedom Way that stretched from Cathedral Square in Vilnius to Medininkai at the Belarus border to support democracy in Belarus and express solidarity with the 2020 Belarusian protests. Alexander Lukashenko's Belarusian government said they sent military helicopters to "stop" balloons sent by Freedom Way protesters.

The Council of the European Union stated on Black Ribbon Day in 2020 that "we commemorate those who fell victim to totalitarian regimes and remember the EU values our society is built on: human dignity, freedom and fundamental rights". EU Commission Vice-President for Values and Transparency Věra Jourová and Commissioner for Justice Didier Reynders stated on the Europe-wide remembrance day in 2020 that the Molotov-Ribbentrop Pact led "to the violation of the fundamental rights of millions of Europeans and it claimed the lives of millions more" and that "freedom from totalitarianism and authoritarianism is [...] a hard-won way of life that we should cherish every day." The Prime Minister of Canada Justin Trudeau stated in 2020 that "we join people around the world to pay tribute to the victims of Communism and Nazism in Europe. We express our solidarity with the survivors and their descendants, and with all those who face violence, loss of dignity, and repression from authoritarian and totalitarian regimes."

=== Black Ribbon Day and Russia ===
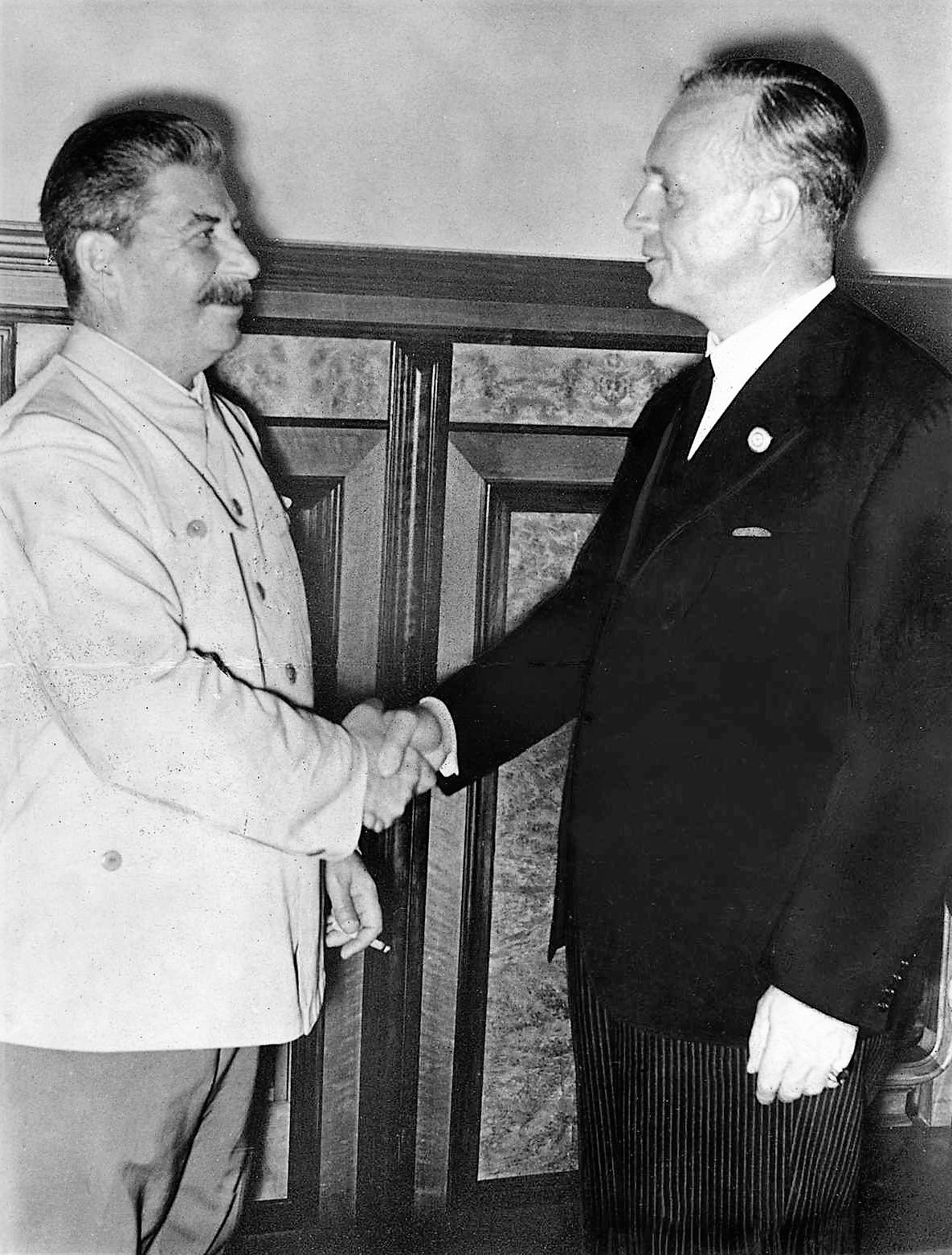
Stalin shakes hands with Ribbentrop after the signing of the Molotov–Ribbentrop Pact.

From the onset, Black Ribbon Day was attacked by the Soviet government in the 1980s. The Soviet Union continued to deny the events of 23 August 1939 and the secret protocol of the Molotov–Ribbentrop Pact. During Putinism, Russia has engaged in disinformation campaigns that included the denial or downplaying of Soviet crimes such as The Holodomor, deportations, the Gulag concentration camp system, massacres or war rape, attempts to deny or justify the Molotov–Ribbentrop Pact and Soviet wars of aggression against Poland, the Baltic states, Finland and other countries, and attempts to promote "a Soviet-era approach to World War II". State-controlled Russian media refer to Soviet crimes as a "Western myth", while in Russian history textbooks, Soviet atrocities are either altered to portray the Soviets positively or omitted entirely. As a result, Western commentators have widely accused Russia of historical negationism. Vladimir Putin's government has vehemently attacked Black Ribbon Day, and the Russian government delegation walked out when the OSCE adopted the Vilnius Declaration in support of the remembrance day. In 2019 the European Parliament adopted its resolution titled "Importance of European remembrance for the future of Europe", that accused "the current Russian leadership [of distorting] historical facts and [whitewashing] crimes committed by the Soviet totalitarian regime", which the resolution described as an "information war waged against democratic Europe;" the resolution highlighted the importance of the European Day of Remembrance for the Victims of Stalinism and Nazism.

In her statement on the European Day of Remembrance for Victims of Stalinism and Nazism in 2022, European Commission President Ursula von der Leyen said that "the painful memory of the past is not just a distant recollection, but has found an echo in Russia's illegal and unjustified war against Ukraine. Today more than ever, we stand united against the Russian state-controlled propaganda that distorts history, spreads conspiracy and punishes those who oppose it. We will continue with determination our work to counter disinformation. And we will ensure that those who stood against totalitarianism will not be forgotten."

On August 22nd 2023, in commemoration of Black Ribbon Day, European Commission Vice President Věra Jourová and European Commissioner for Justice Didier Reynders said Russian President Vladimir Putin is returning "war, persecution, and illegal occupation" to Europe with his invasion of Ukraine.

== Observance in the EU ==
=== Union-level ===
The remembrance day has been officially observed by the institutions of the European Union since 2009, especially by the European Parliament, the European Commission and the Council of the European Union.

=== By country ===
In some countries, the remembrance day has been formally adopted by local law (sometimes with slightly different names), whereas in other countries, commemoration has taken place based on its proclamation by the Union.

==== Bulgaria ====
On 19 November 2009, under a proposal of the centre-right Blue Coalition, the Bulgarian Parliament officially declared 23 August the Day of Commemoration of the Victims of the Crimes Committed by Communist and other Totalitarian Regimes and the remembrance day was officially observed for the first time in 2010.

==== Croatia ====
In 2011, the government of Croatia proposed that Croatia adopt the European Day of Remembrance of Victims of All Totalitarian and Authoritarian Regimes, to be commemorated on 23 August. The government sent its recommendation for urgent parliamentary procedure, stating that the new memorial day is in accordance with the European practice that marks 23 August as the day of remembrance of victims of Stalinism and Nazism. On 23 August 2011, Croatia marked the European Day of Remembrance for Victims of Stalinism and Nazism for the first time. Prime Minister Jadranka Kosor said: "We especially pay tribute to the victims of Nazism and the ustasha regime in Croatia. However, we are now also trying to pave the way for investigations into communist crimes and to cease treating that issue as a taboo. We must remember all victims equally."

==== Czech Republic ====
The European Day of Remembrance for Victims of Stalinism and Nazism is officially commemorated by the government of the Czech Republic, which also initiated its establishment.

==== Estonia ====
On 18 June 2009, the Parliament of Estonia amended the law on holidays and memorials, and adopted 23 August as the Day of Remembrance for Victims of Stalinism and Nazism. In 2020 the official commemoration took place at the new Memorial to the Victims of Communism.

==== Finland ====
In 2019 the European Day of Remembrance for Victims of Stalinism and Nazism was observed by the Government of Finland on the 80th anniversary of the signing of the Molotov-Ribbentrop Pact.

==== Germany ====
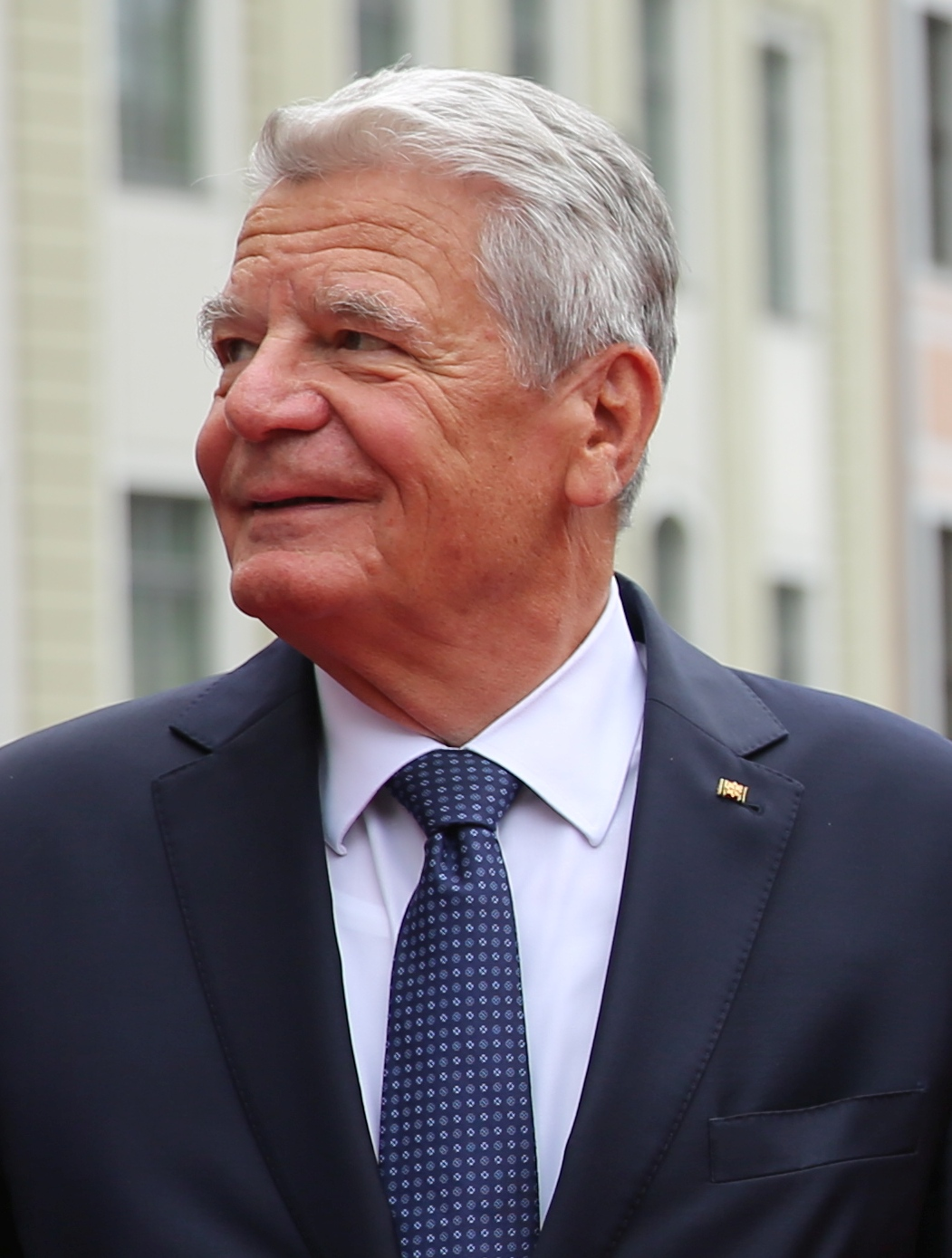
Joachim Gauck, the President of Germany from 2012 to 2017, proposed the remembrance day together with Václav Havel.

The former President of Germany, Joachim Gauck, was one of the statesmen, alongside Václav Havel, who proposed the establishment of the remembrance day. The European Day of Remembrance for Victims of Stalinism and Nazism has been observed by various German government bodies, including the federal government. One of the first government bodies to observe the day was the Federal Foundation for the Reappraisal of the SED Dictatorship, a federal government entity created by the Bundestag to research and document the communist dictatorship in East Germany. In 2020 the remembrance day was officially commemorated by the German federal government and the German presidency of the European Union.

The remembrance day is also observed by various state governments, such as the state government of Brandenburg and local government authorities. It is also observed by, for example, the CDU-affiliated Konrad Adenauer Foundation or the German chapter of the civil rights organisation Memorial.

The remembrance day is also commemorated by the European Network Remembrance and Solidarity, a Warsaw-based international organisation established by Germany, Poland, Hungary and Slovakia and since also joined by Romania, that documents the totalitarian regimes in Europe and commemorates their victims and resistance to totalitarian regimes.

==== Hungary ====
In 2011, the European Day of Remembrance for Victims of Stalinism and Nazism was commemorated by the government of Hungary for the first time. A spokesman for the Fidesz party (itself a national-conservative and right-wing populist party) government said that "youth growing up in Western Europe should learn what it means to be a victim of Communism," adding that there is "little difference" between "national and international Socialism [...] both involve the same destruction, and a basic characteristic for both is inhumanity."

==== Latvia ====
On 17 July 2009, the Parliament of Latvia adopted 23 August as the Day of Remembrance for Victims of Stalinism and Nazism, under a proposal of the Civic Union.

==== Lithuania ====
Lithuania in 2009 officially renamed "Black Ribbon Day" (23 August) to "European Day of Remembrance for Victims of Stalinism and Nazism and Day of the Baltic Way", a double anniversary of both events. As on other days of mourning, Lithuanian flags are displayed outside all public buildings decorated with black ribbons.

==== Poland ====
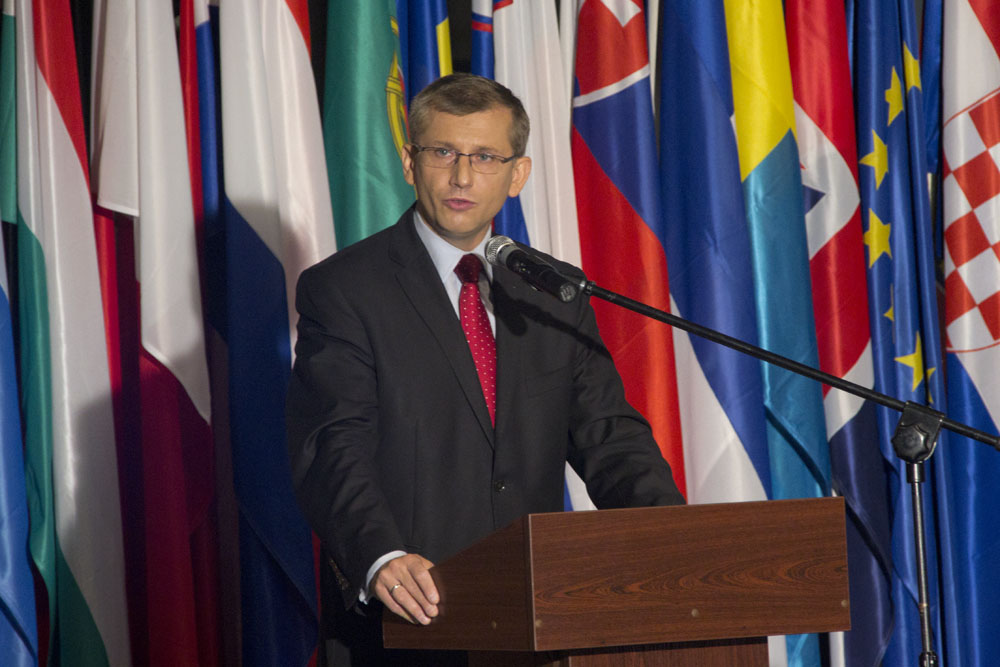
Minister of Justice of Poland Krzysztof Kwiatkowski during the official commemoration of European Day of Remembrance for Victims of Stalinism and Nazism in 2011, during Poland's EU presidency

In 2011, the European Day of Remembrance for Victims of Stalinism and Nazism was officially commemorated in Poland for the first time by the liberal-conservative Civic Platform government during Poland's EU presidency. It has since been observed annually by the Government of Poland as an important official remembrance day of Poland.

==== Romania ====
In Romania, 23 August is celebrated with some duality. Before the Romanian Revolution, it marked Liberation from Fascist Occupation Day, which is observed to commemorate the Soviet occupation of Romania, styled as "Liberation" by the communists. In 2011, the European Day of Remembrance for the Victims of All Totalitarian Regimes was officially commemorated for the first time after 21 years of 23 August not having been celebrated as an official holiday since the Romanian Revolution, as that day marked both Romania's loss of most of the region that is now Moldova and parts of Ukraine, with Romanian-speaking communities, as a result of the provisions of the aforementioned Pact (see Soviet occupation of Bessarabia and Northern Bukovina) and the end of the pro-Axis government of Antonescu.

==== Slovenia ====
On 8 August 2012, the Slovenian government adopted a resolution proclaiming 23 August European Day of Remembrance for the Victims of All Totalitarian and Authoritarian Regimes.

==== Sweden ====
The International Day of Remembrance for Victims of Stalinism and Nazism has been observed in Sweden since 2008, with participation from government members. Sweden was the first country to observe the remembrance day officially.

== Observance of Black Ribbon Day outside the EU ==
=== Albania ===
Albania officially observed the European Day of Remembrance for Victims of Stalinism and Nazism in 2019; President Ilir Meta noted that Stalinism and Nazism were "two devastating ideologies of the last century that caused thousands of innocent victims in our country. For 45 years, Albania became the North Korea of Europe. Thousands of Albanians were killed, imprisoned, and deported. Freedom, human rights, democracy and pluralism were values they believed in and for which they sacrificed their lives. It is our duty to teach the younger generations the truth of our recent past so that it will never be repeated again."

=== Canada ===
Canadian refugee communities were instrumental in establishing Black Ribbon Day in Canada in 1986 and became the inspiration for the Baltic Way during the Revolutions of 1989. In 2009, the House of Commons of Canada unanimously adopted 23 August as Black Ribbon Day, the national day of remembrance in Canada of the victims of Stalinism and Nazism. The resolution was introduced by Liberal MP Bob Rae and co-sponsored by Borys Wrzesnewskyj. The Central and Eastern European Council of Canada, representing 4 million Canadians, has organised annual Black Ribbon Day commemorations in cities across Canada since 2010.

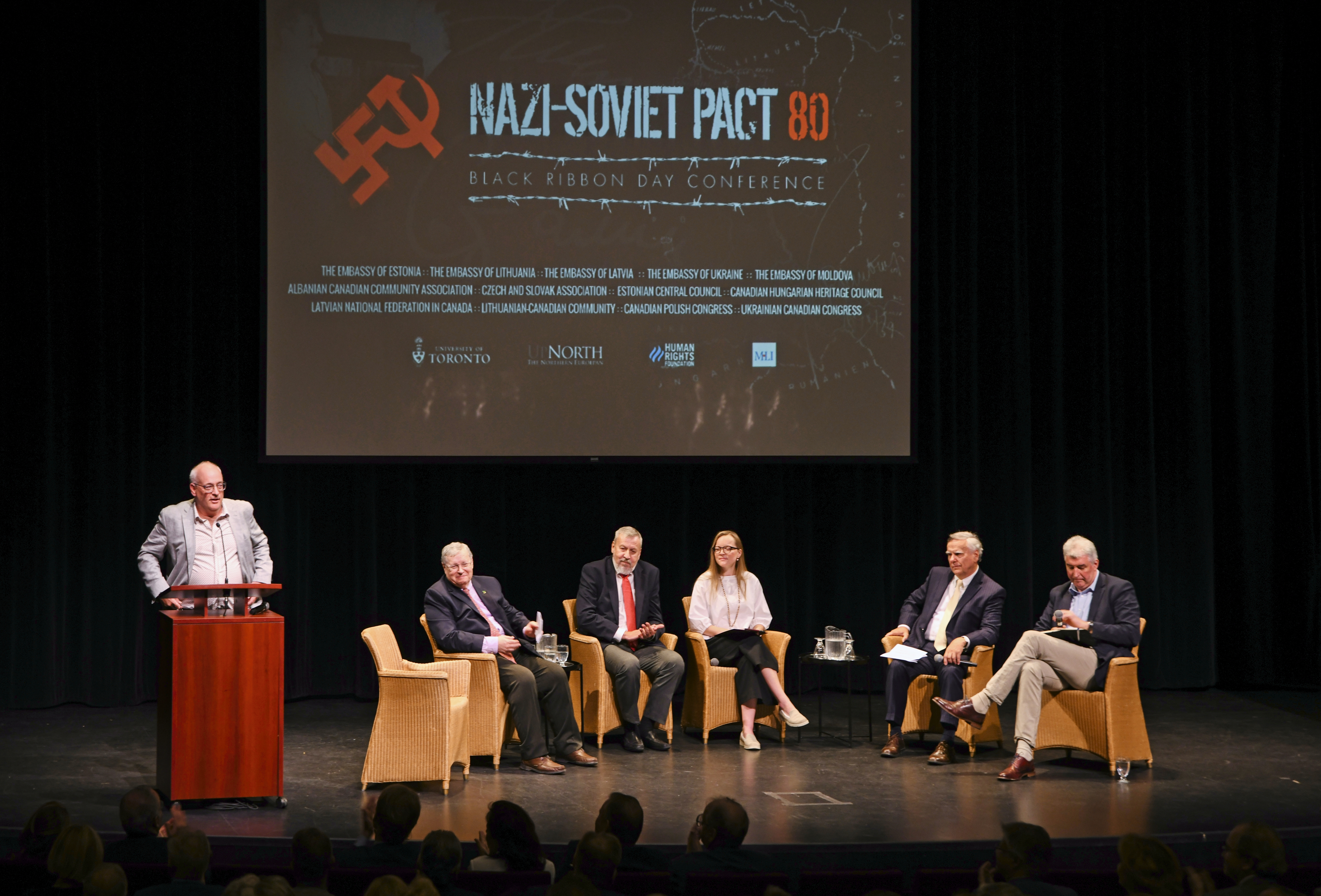
Black Ribbon Day Conference in Toronto, September 2019

=== Georgia ===
On 21 July 2010, in a unanimous vote, the Parliament of Georgia instituted the Soviet Occupation Day on 25 February and declared 23 August the Day of Memory of Victims of Totalitarian Regimes.

=== Norway ===
The leader of the social-liberal Liberal Party in Norway, Trine Skei Grande, has called for the official commemoration of the European Day of Remembrance for Victims of Stalinism and Nazism in Norway, based on its adoption by the European Parliament and the Organization for Security and Co-operation in Europe.

=== Ukraine ===
Black Ribbon Day is officially observed by Ukraine. On Black Ribbon Day in 2022, the Ukrainian government compared Stalin and Hitler to Vladimir Putin.

=== United Kingdom ===
Since 2019, the European Day of Remembrance for Victims of Stalinism and Nazism has been observed by the city of London. The Mayor of London, Sadiq Khan, noted that "now more than ever we must show our commitment to fighting extremism, authoritarianism and intolerance in all its forms."

=== United States ===
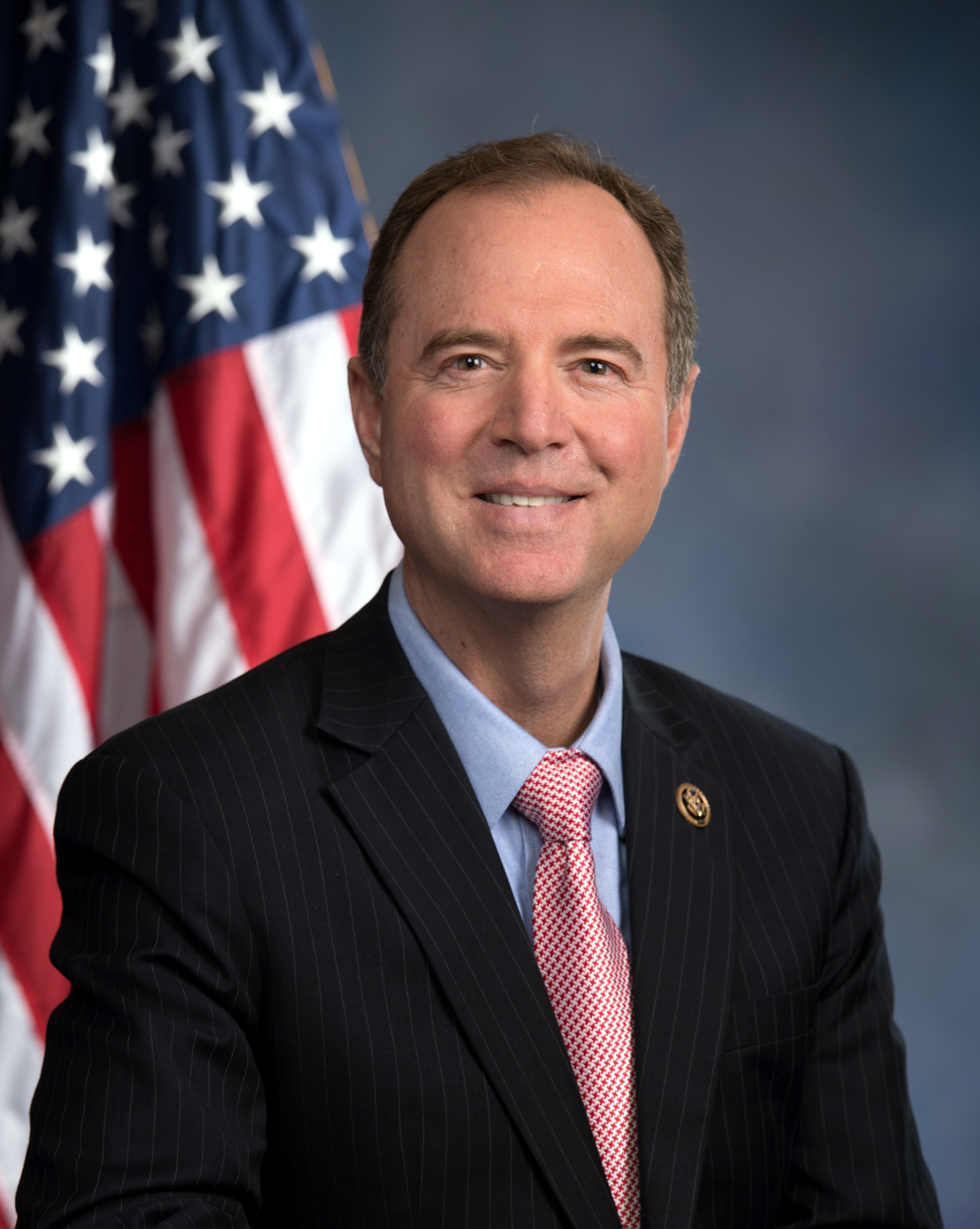
Democrat Adam Schiff co-sponsored House Resolution 300, titled "Expressing support for the designation of August 23, 2019, as Black Ribbon Day to recognize the victims of Soviet and Nazi regimes."

On 16 July 2013, Member of Congress John Shimkus introduced the resolution "H.Res. 302: Expressing support for designation of August 23 as Black Ribbon Day to recognize the victims of Soviet Communist and Nazi regimes," proposing that the United States Congress adopts Black Ribbon Day "to recognize the victims of Soviet Communist and Nazi regimes."

On 21 May 2014, the United States Congress adopted a resolution supporting "the designation of Black Ribbon Day to recognize the victims of Soviet Communist and Nazi regimes" and to "remember and never forget the terror millions of citizens in Central and Eastern Europe experienced for more than 40 years by ruthless military, economic, and political repression of the people through arbitrary executions, mass arrests, deportations, the suppression of free speech, confiscation of private property, and the destruction of cultural and moral identity and civil society, all of which deprived the vast majority of the peoples of Central and Eastern Europe of their basic human rights and dignity, separating them from the democratic world by means of the Iron Curtain and the Berlin Wall," and stating that "the extreme forms of totalitarian rule practiced by the Soviet Communist and Nazi regimes led to premeditated and vast crimes committed against millions of human beings and their basic and inalienable rights on a scale unseen before in history."

In 2019 the United States Congress adopted House Resolution 300, titled "Expressing support for the designation of August 23, 2019, as Black Ribbon Day to recognize the victims of Soviet and Nazi regimes." The resolution was co-sponsored by Republicans John Shimkus and Gus Bilirakis, and Democrats Adam Schiff, Jamie Raskin, Ilhan Omar, Denny Heck, Joyce Beatty, Ruben Gallego and David Trone.

== Observance by other entities ==
On 8 August 2011, the Mejlis of the Crimean Tatar People recognised the European Day of Remembrance for Victims of Stalinism and Nazism, stating that "the Crimean Tatar people [...] suffered the crimes, committed by the Communist regime of the USSR in the 20th century admitted as a genocide."

Black Ribbon Day has been commemorated annually by the World Jewish Congress, which noted in 2019 that the day honours the "memory of the tens of millions of victims of totalitarian regimes" and "coincides with the signing of the 1939 pact between Nazi Germany and the USSR, in which eastern Europe was divided and brutality conquered."

== See also ==
- Comparison of Nazism and Stalinism
- Council of Europe resolution 1481
- Days of Remembrance of the Victims of the Holocaust (United States)
- Declaration on Crimes of Communism
- Ghost Festival
- Platform of European Memory and Conscience
- Reconciliation of European Histories Group
- World Freedom Day (United States)
- International Holocaust Remembrance Day
