= Alexandra Laignel-Lavastine =

French philosopher, essayist and historian (born 1966)

Alexandra Laignel-Lavastine (born 17 October 1966) is a French philosopher, essayist, and historian of East European history and culture.

Laignel-Lavastine holds a PhD in History and Philosophy. She studied at Paris-Sorbonne University and then at the Center for Training of Journalists (CFJ), before devoting herself to a career as an essayist.

== Honors and distinctions ==
In 2005, Laignel-Lavastine won the Charles-Veillon European prize for essays for Spirits of Europe: Paris, Calmann-Lévy, 2005.

Laignel-Lavastine was awarded the LICRA 2015 Prize for Lost Thought: Islamism, populism, anti-Semitism. Essay on the suicidal tendencies of Europe (Grasset).

== Publications ==
=== Scientific works and essays ===
- Mon Après-Guerre à Paris par Serge Moscovici (texte établi, annoté et préfacé par Alexandra Laignel-Lavastine), Grasset, 2019, 377 pages.
- La Pensée égarée. Islamisme, populisme, antisémitisme. Essai sur les penchants suicidaires de l'Europe, Grasset, 2015, 220 pages.
- L'horreur oubliée : la Shoah à la roumaine, numéro spécial de la Revue d'histoire de la Shoah, no 194, Mémorial de la Shoah, janvier-juin 2011 (en collaboration avec Florence Heymann).
- La Révolution du livre numérique (avec les contributions de Marc Tessier, Bruno Racine, Jean-Noël Jeanneney, Teresa Cremisi, Bernard Fixot et François Samuelson), Paris, Odile Jacob, 2011, collection "Penser la société".
- Luc Ferry, l'anticonformiste. Une biographie intellectuelle, entretiens avec Alexandra Laignel-Lavastine, Paris, Denoël, 2011, 387 pages. (ISBN 978-2-20726161-3)
- Cartea Neagra : Le livre noir de la destruction des Juifs de Roumanie (1941–1944), de Matatias Carp; Alexandra Laignel-Lavastine pour la traduction, la présentation et l'édition critique, Paris, Denoël, 2009, collection "Médiations", 706 pages. (ISBN 2-207-26059-3)
- Le Pouvoir de la langue et la Liberté de l'esprit. Essai sur la résistance au langage totalitaire (Orwell, Klemperer, Sternberger, Wat), recueil d'essais de Jacques Dewitte, Paris, Michalon, 2007, 262 pages.
- Esprits d'Europe. Autour de Czesław Miłosz, Jan Patočka, István Bibó, Paris, Calmann-Lévy, 2005, 353 pages (ISBN 2-7021-3464-5); Folio Gallimard 2010 pour l'édition de poche. (ISBN 978-2-07-043589-0)
- Cioran, Eliade, Ionesco. L'oubli du fascisme : trois intellectuels roumains dans la tourmente du siècle, Paris, PUF, "Perspectives critiques", 2002, 550 pages (ISBN 2-13-051783-8)
- Qu'est-ce qu'être Juif ? Cinquante sages répondent à Ben Gourion (1958, document inédit), présenté par Eliezer Ben-Rafaël, Paris, Balland, 2001.
- Jan Patočka. L'esprit de la dissidence, Paris, Michalon, "Le bien commun", 1998 (ISBN 2-84186-070-1)
- Constantin Noïca : nationalisme et philosophie, ou le paradoxe roumain, Bucarest, Humanitas, 1998 pour l'édition roumaine (trad. E. Marcu), 390 pages (version publiée de la thèse de doctorat).
- Raison et Conviction : l'Engagement (avec les contributions de Michelle Perrot, Serge Moscovici, Nicole Notat, Pierre Pachet), Paris, Textuel, 1998 (en collaboration avec Michel Wieviorka).

=== Selected publications ===
- "Is Democratic Europe on a Path toward Suicide ?", Israel Journal of Foreign Affairs, WJC, Jerusalem, Septembre 2014, vol. 8, n° 3, p. 49-62 (en anglais)
- "Europe ili kako se oduprijeti imperijalizmu svakodnevice", Europski Glasnik, n° 18, 2014, Zagreb, p. 157-192.
- "Samoubilacke sklonosti demokratske Europe", Europski Glasnik, n° 19, 2015, Zagreb, p. 7-16.
- "La place de la Shoah dans l'œuvre du prix Nobel de littérature Czesław Miłosz", dans Jean-Charles Szurek et Annette Wieviorka (sous la dir. de), Les Juifs et la Pologne (1939–2004), Paris, Albin Michel, 2009, p. 273-290.
- "À l'Est, du nouveau ?", dans Le Théâtre des Idées : 50 penseurs pour comprendre le XXIe siècle, Paris, Flammarion, 2008, p. 56-69.
- "Les leçons du XXe siècle ou l'héritage oublié de la pensée centre-européenne", dans Nicolas Weill (sous la dir. de), Existe-t-il une Europe philosophique ?, Presses universitaires de Rennes, octobre 2005, p. 75-86.
- "La dissidence peut-elle encore nous aider à penser l'Europe ?", dans Patrick Savidan (sous la dir. de), La République ou l'Europe ?, Paris, Grasset, 2004, p. 251-281.
- "Des intellectuels contre la mémoire : remarques sur les ressorts d'une exaspération française", dans Thomas Ferenczi (sous la dir. de), Devoir de mémoire, droit à l'oubli ?, Éditions Complexe, Bruxelles, 2002, p. 33-38.
- "Le National-communisme", dans Daniel Cefaï (sous la dir. de), Cultures politiques, Paris, collection "la politique éclatée", PUF, 2001, p. 341-364.
- "Fascisme et communisme en Roumanie : enjeux et usages d'une comparaison", dans Henry Rousso (sous la dir. de), Stalinisme et nazisme : Histoire et Mémoires comparées, Éditions Complexe, Bruxelles, 1999, p. 201-245.
- "La double dissidence de Jan Patočka : entre pratique politique et européanité critique", dans A. Bachoud, M. Trebitch, J. Cuesta (sous la dir. de), Les Intellectuels et l'Europe, de 1945 à nos jours, Paris, Publications universitaires Denis Diderot, 2000, p. 137-153.
- "Le XXe siècle roumain ou la modernité problématique", dans Chantal Delsol et Michel Maslowski (sous la dir. de), Histoire des idées politiques de l'Europe centrale, Paris, PUF, 1998, p. 563-587. [Prix de l'Académie des sciences morales et politiques].
- "L'Europe centrale et orientale : l'année 1998", dans Pascal Boniface (sous la dir. de), L'Année stratégique, Bruxelles, Éditions Complexe, 1998, p. 41-66.
- "La Roumanie prise au piège de ses représentations historiques", dans Noëlle Burgi (sous la direction de), Fractures de l'État-nation, Paris, Éditions Kimé, collection "Perspectives politiques", 1994, p. 27-43.
- "L'Allemagne vue de Roumanie : les complexes ancestraux ?", dans Michel Korinman (sous la dir. de), L'Allemagne vue d'ailleurs, Paris, Balland, 1992, p. 241-255.
- "Esquisse d'un état des lieux du paysage mémoriel en France, des années 90 aux années 2000", La Célibataire (revue de psychanalyse dirigée par Charles Melman), no 20, été 2010, p. 89-105.
- "Le Pogrom de Iași de juin 1941 : un témoignage" (entretien avec Isac Chiva), Les Temps Modernes, avril 2003, p. 7-20.
- "Les avatars du post-communisme" (dossier), Les Temps modernes, mars-avril-mai 2001, p. 158-212 (en coll. avec M. D. Gheorghiu et L. Kandel).
- "L'Autre Europe et "nous", des années 1980 aux années 1990", Le Débat, no 107, novembre-décembre 1999, p. 118-136.
- "L'Allemagne de Schröder : une nation en quête de normalité ?" (dossier), La Revue internationale et stratégique, PUF, no 33, printemps 1999, p. 44-73.
- "Kosovo, retour sur un conflit", entretien avec Jean-Louis Dufour et Jacques Rupnik, La Revue internationale et stratégique, no 33, printemps 1999, p. 22-37.
- "Réflexions autour du dixième anniversaire de la chute du communisme", entretien avec François Fejtö, La Revue internationale et stratégique, PUF, no 35, automne 1999, p. 18-24.
- "Morale et relations internationales", entretien avec Pascal Boniface et Antoine Garapon, La Revue internationale et stratégique, PUF, no 35, 1999, p. 25-33.
- "Le jeune Cioran : De l'inconvénient d'avoir été fasciste", Le Débat, no 93, janvier-février 1997, p. 102-120.
- "Jan Patočka et la nation citoyenne", Revue de philosophie politique, no 8, Presses universitaires de France, 1997, p. 223-240.
- "Quelle issue à la dialectique négative du mondial et du local ?", L'Art du comprendre (revue d'anthropologie philosophique), no 5-6, décembre 1996, p. 98-116.
- "Les élections législatives de décembre 1993 en Serbie", La Nouvelle Alternative, no 33, Paris, mars 1994, p. 50-52.
- "Lieux et domaines de la recherche sur l'histoire du temps présent", Les Cahiers de l'Institut d'Histoire du Temps Présent (IHTP / CNRS), no 54, décembre 1993, p. 42-54.
- "Roumanie : l'introuvable société civile", La Nouvelle Alternative, no 28, décembre 1992, p. 46-50.
- "Le poids du nationalisme dans la transition roumaine", L'Autre Europe, 1992, no 24-25, p. 110-132.
- "Roumanie : le heurt des légitimités autoproclamées" (dossier), La Nouvelle Alternative, no 17, mars 1990, p. 30-40.
- "Le plan de systématisation du territoire et des localités en Roumanie" (dossier), La Nouvelle Alternative, no 14, juin 1989, p. 30-40.
- "La Roumanie sous Conducator" (dossier), La Nouvelle Alternative, no 7, hiver 1987.

=== Translations ===
- Cartea Neagra: le livre noir de la destruction des Juifs de Roumanie (1940–1944), Paris, Denoël, 2009.
- Les Pirates juifs des Caraïbes, de Edward Kritzler, 2012 chez André Versaille Éditeur.
- "Journal du ghetto de Djurin, Transnistrie : 1941–1943", de Myriam Korber, dans l'anthologie L'Enfant et le Génocide. Témoignages sur l'enfance pendant la Shoah (dir. Catherine Coquio et Aurélia Kalisky), Paris, Robert Laffont, coll. "Bouquins", 2007.
- De la limite. Petit traité à l'usage des orgueilleux, du philosophe Gabriel Liiceanu, Paris, Michalon, 1997.
- Itinéraires d'une vie : E. M. Cioran, de G. Liiceanu, Paris, Michalon, 1995.
