= Vilnius Declaration =

The Vilnius Declaration was a declaration adopted by the Organization for Security and Co-operation in Europe (OSCE) during the 18th annual session of its parliamentary assembly, that took place in Vilnius from 29 June to 3 July 2009.

The declaration contained 28 resolutions that addressed a number of issues, including "...strengthening of the OSCE, election observation, the food security in the OSCE area, the world financial crisis and the social consequences of that crisis, Iran, Afghanistan, human rights and civil liberties, arms control and disarmament in Europe, labour migration in Central Asia, energy security, climate change, water management, freedom of expression on the Internet, and a moratorium on the death penalty." Its condemnation of totalitarianism and support for the European Day of Remembrance for Victims of Stalinism and Nazism provoked protests by Russia and international media attention.

== Condemnation of totalitarianism ==
Its resolution on "Europe Reunited: Promoting Human Rights and Civil Liberties in the OSCE Region in the 21st Century" is notable for its condemnation of totalitarianism. The resolution states that "in the twentieth century European countries experienced two major totalitarian regimes, Nazi and Stalinist, which brought about genocide, violations of human rights and freedoms, war crimes and crimes against humanity," urges all OSCE members to take a "united stand against all totalitarian rule from whatever ideological background," condemns "the glorification of the totalitarian regimes, including the holding of public demonstrations glorifying the Nazi or Stalinist past," and expresses support for the European Day of Remembrance for Victims of Stalinism and Nazism, which was proclaimed by the European Parliament in 2008.

The resolution was criticized by Russia, as Joseph Stalin "continues to be a hero to many Russians". The Russian delegation tried but failed to have the resolution withdrawn. Of 213 present delegates from 50 countries, 201 supported the resolution, 8 voted against and 4 abstained.
