= Martin Böttger =

German politician

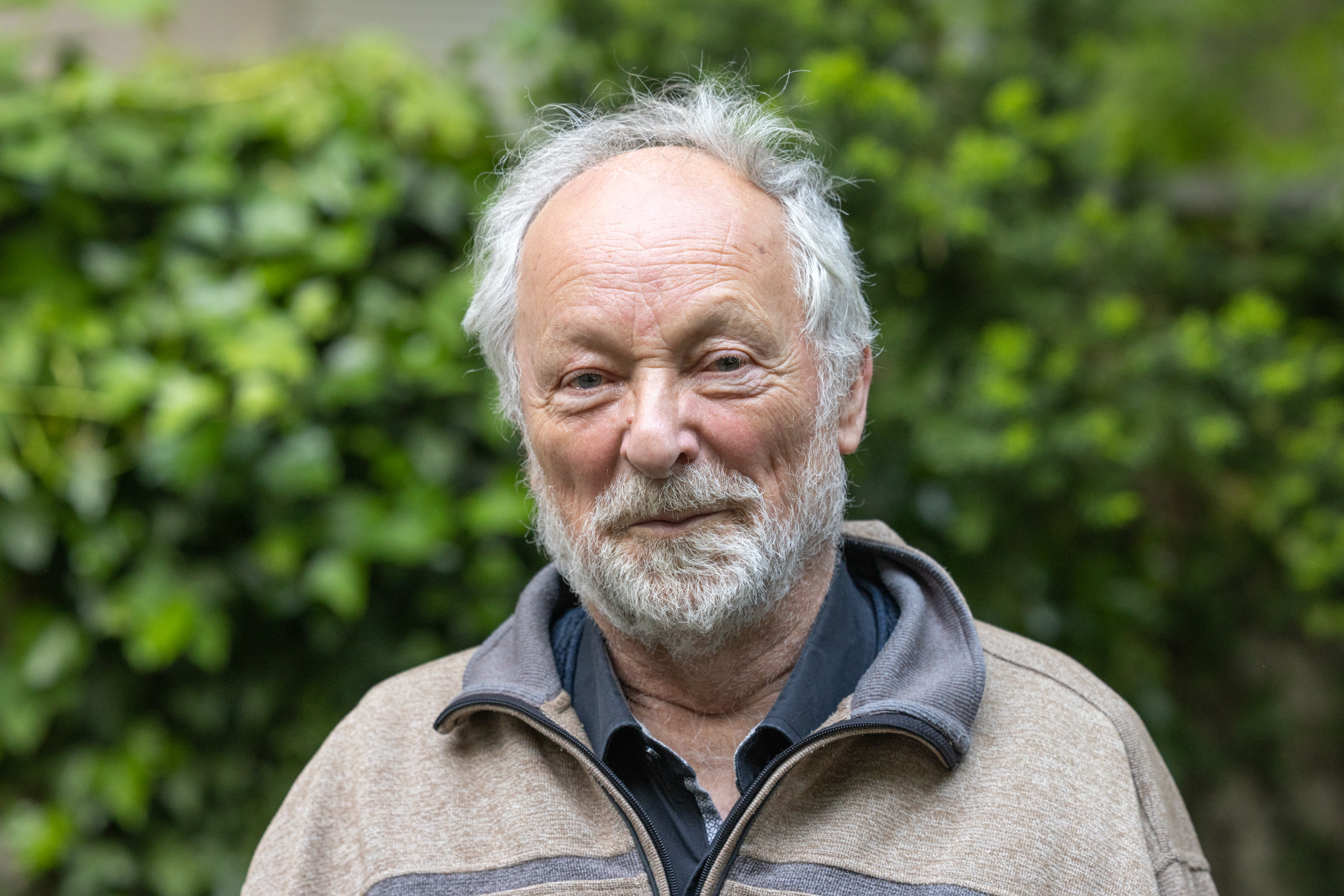
Martin Böttger

Martin Böttger (born 14 May 1947 in Frankenhain, a village now part of Frohburg) was a prominent civil rights activist in East Germany. He was a member of the Landtag of the Free State of Saxony from 1990 to 1994 and led the faction of Alliance '90/The Greens.

== Life and politics ==
Böttger studied physics at the TU Dresden and was a Construction soldier until 1972. Since 1972 he was active in church-based peace activism. He worked as a computer programmer at Robotron Karl-Marx-Stadt until 1976 and at Versorgungskontor Leder until 1979. He worked as a research associate at the Deutsche Bauakademie until 1983. In 1982 he gained a doctorate in technical mechanics at the TU Dresden under Günther Landgraf.

In 1976 and 1980 he was briefly arrested by the Stasi for participating in first of May demonstrations using a self-made sign. In September 1983 he was arrested for a longer period for "attempted participation in a human chain during the International Day of Peace". From the year 1985 on, Böttger worked as a computer programmer at the state-owned gasoline retailer Minol. In 1985 he co-founded the Initiative for Peace and Human Rights, led this group's task force "Human rights and the judiciary" and contributed to the publication and dissemination of underground Samizdat magazines.

In 1989 he was a founding member of New Forum and the coordinator of this civil rights movement in the district of Karl-Marx-Stadt. In March 1990 he was elected into the Volkskammer with Bündnis 90, but immediately handed the mandate to Werner Schulz. Until 1994 he was a delegate to the Landtag of the Free State of Saxony. From 1994 he was the managing director of a group of homes for the elderly in Kirchberg, Saxony. From 2001 until 2010 he was the director of the Chemnitz branch of the Stasi Records Agency. He lives in retirement in Saxony and has been a Green party member of the city council of Zwickau since 2009. He is the chairman of the Martin Luther King Center for Nonviolence and Civil Courage in Werdau.

Böttger plays the organ and composes classical music.

== Accolades ==
On 26 May 1997 he was awarded the Sächsische Verfassungsmedaille by the president of the Landtag of Saxony Erich Iltgen. In 2000 the German National Foundation honored him among other co-founders of the New Forum with the Deutsche Nationalpreis. On 13 October 2009 he was awarded the Order of Merit of the Free State of Saxony in celebration of the 20 year anniversary of Die Wende.

== Publications ==
- War die SED eine kriminelle Organisation? (PDF; 1,2 MB) Freiheit und Recht, 2/2010, page 12
- IFM-Archiv Sachsen e.V.: Absage an Praxis und Prinzip der Abgrenzung, Pfingsten 1987, Digitalisat. Undersigned: Almut Berger, Karl-Heinz Bonnke, Dr. Hans-Jürgen Fischbeck, Reinhard Lampe, Stephan Bickhardt, Dr. Martin Böttger, Dorrit Fischer, Ludwig Mehlhorn, Anette von Bodecker, Erich Busse and Martin König.

== Bürokratopoly ==
Bürokratopoly is an educational tabletop game. Its author Martin Böttger used to satirize the East German state in the early 1980s. The game spread in the political underground. Over 30 years after its development it was remade and optimized as a teaching aid for use in history class. Bürokratopoly captures an authentic perspective on East Germany in game form and provokes discussions of democracy, politics and human rights.

== Sources ==
- Werner Schulz (Hrsg.): Der Bündnis-Fall. Politische Perspektiven 10 Jahre nach Gründung des Bündnis 90. Edition Temmen, Bremen 2001, ISBN 3-86108-796-0
- Ilko-Sascha Kowalczuk & Tom Sello (Hrsg.): Für ein freies Land mit freien Menschen. Opposition und Widerstand in Biographien und Fotos. Robert-Havemann-Gesellschaft in Verbindung mit der Stiftung zur Aufarbeitung der SED-Diktatur, Berlin 2006, S. 318–320, ISBN 3938857021
- Eckhard Jesse (Hrsg.): Friedliche Revolution und deutsche Einheit. Sächsische Bürgerrechtler ziehen Bilanz. Christoph Links, Berlin 2006, ISBN 978-3-86153-379-5
- Karl-Heinz Baum & Roland Walter (Hrsg.): „…ehrlich und gewissenhaft…" Mielkes Mannen gegen das Neue Forum. zba.BUCH, Berlin 2008, ISBN 978-3-9811977-2-3
- Ehrhart Neubert: Geschichte der Opposition in der DDR 1949–1989. Bundeszentrale für politische Bildung, Bonn 1997, ISBN 3-86153-163-1.
- Martin Thiele, Michael Geithner: Nachgemacht. Spielekopien aus der DDR mit einem Beitrag "Doppeltes Gesellschaftsspiel" von Martin Böttger; DDR Museum Verlag Berlin 2013, ISBN 978-3-939801-18-4
