= Initiative for Peace and Human Rights =

1986–1991 political party in East Germany

Initiative for Peace and Human Rights Initiative für Frieden und Menschenrechte
- The party logo
- Abbreviation: IFM
- Founded: 24 January 1986
- Dissolved: 21 September 1991
- Merged into: Alliance 90
- Ideology: Pacifism; Human rights Anti-communism

The Initiative for Peace and Human Rights (German: Initiative für Frieden und Menschenrechte, IFM) was the oldest opposition group in East Germany. It was founded on 24 January 1986 and was independent of the churches and state. On 7 February 1990, it joined with New Forum and Democracy Now to form the electoral Alliance 90 and merged with them to form the Alliance 90 party on 21 September 1991.

== Before the Peaceful Revolution ==
The Initiative emerged from a human rights seminar in East Berlin that was planned for 16 November 1985 but was cancelled by the Berlin-Brandenburg state church due to Stasi pressure. At first, it had a loose organizational structure and about 30 members. People involved in the IFM included Bärbel Bohley, Werner Fischer, Peter Grimm, Ralf Hirsch, Gerd Poppe, Ulrike Poppe, Martin Böttger, Wolfgang Templin and Ibrahim Böhme. It cooperated with the churches but was independent from them. The Initiative campaigned for disarmament and demilitarization and was against any kind of authoritarian structure, the glorification of violence and the exclusion of minorities and foreigners. The positions were published, among others, in the illegal magazine grenzfall. In February 1986, a social revolutionary wing led by Thomas Klein and Reinhard Schult split from the Initiative and formed the Gruppe Gegenstimmen.

In January 1988, several members of the IFM were arrested in connection with the state-sponsored Liebknecht-Luxemburg Memorial March in Berlin and subsequently deported to the West. Ralf Hirsch was expatriated. In November 1988, when the Romanian leader Nicolae Ceaușescu was invited to visit East Germany, civil rights activists organized a Romanian evening in the Gethsemane Church in East Berlin in order to draw attention to the violation of fundamental rights and the catastrophic living standards in Romania. Subsequently, several members of the IFM were placed under house arrest during the Ceauşescu visit. These and other Zersetzung psychological warfare measures of the Stasi severely hampered the work of the IFM in the subsequent period.

== During the Peaceful Revolution ==
On 11 March 1989, the IFM became the first opposition group to expand across all of East Germany. The Initiative's activity surged during the Peaceful Revolution, but its numbers were modest compared to the new opposition forces. The first regular East Germany-wide meeting took place on 28 October 1989. Werner Fischer (Berlin), Gerd Poppe (Berlin) and Thomas Rudolph (Leipzig) were elected for six months as speakers. The Initiative was part of the East German Round Table, with two members. Gerd Poppe became a minister without portfolio in the Hans Modrow government on 5 February 1990. On 7 February 1990 it joined with New Forum and Democracy Now to form the electoral Alliance 90. In the 18 March 1990 East German general election, the Alliance scored 2.9% of the vote and received 12 seats in the Volkskammer.
