= Land Brandenburg Commissioner for the Study of the Repercussions of the Communist Dictatorship =

The Commissioner of the Land of Brandenburg for the Study of the Repercussions of the Communist Dictatorship is responsible for advising residents of Brandenburg who were directly persecuted or indirectly affected by the communist rule during the period of Soviet occupation from 1945-49 and during the existence of the German Democratic Republic from 1949-1989. The agency is formally known as "die Beauftragte des Landes Brandenburg zur Aufarbeitung der Folgen der kommunistischen Diktatur“ (abbreviated as LAkD) and usually referred to as „Die Landesbeauftragte für Aufarbeitung“ or „Die Aufarbeitungsbeauftragte“.

== Background ==
=== The Brandenburg "Aufarbeitungsbeauftragtengesetz" ===
On 7 July 2009, in one of the last sessions of the legislative period, the Brandenburg state parliament approved the “Aufarbeitungsbeauftragtengesetz”. While similar legislation had been passed in all the other new states by the early 1990s, Brandenburg was the last to catch up under the Grand Coalition of Christian (CDU) and Social Democrats (SPD). The commissioner's official title differs from that of her counterparts in other states, who are generally referred to as "Commissioner for the Stasi Records".

=== Political situation after the 2009 state elections ===
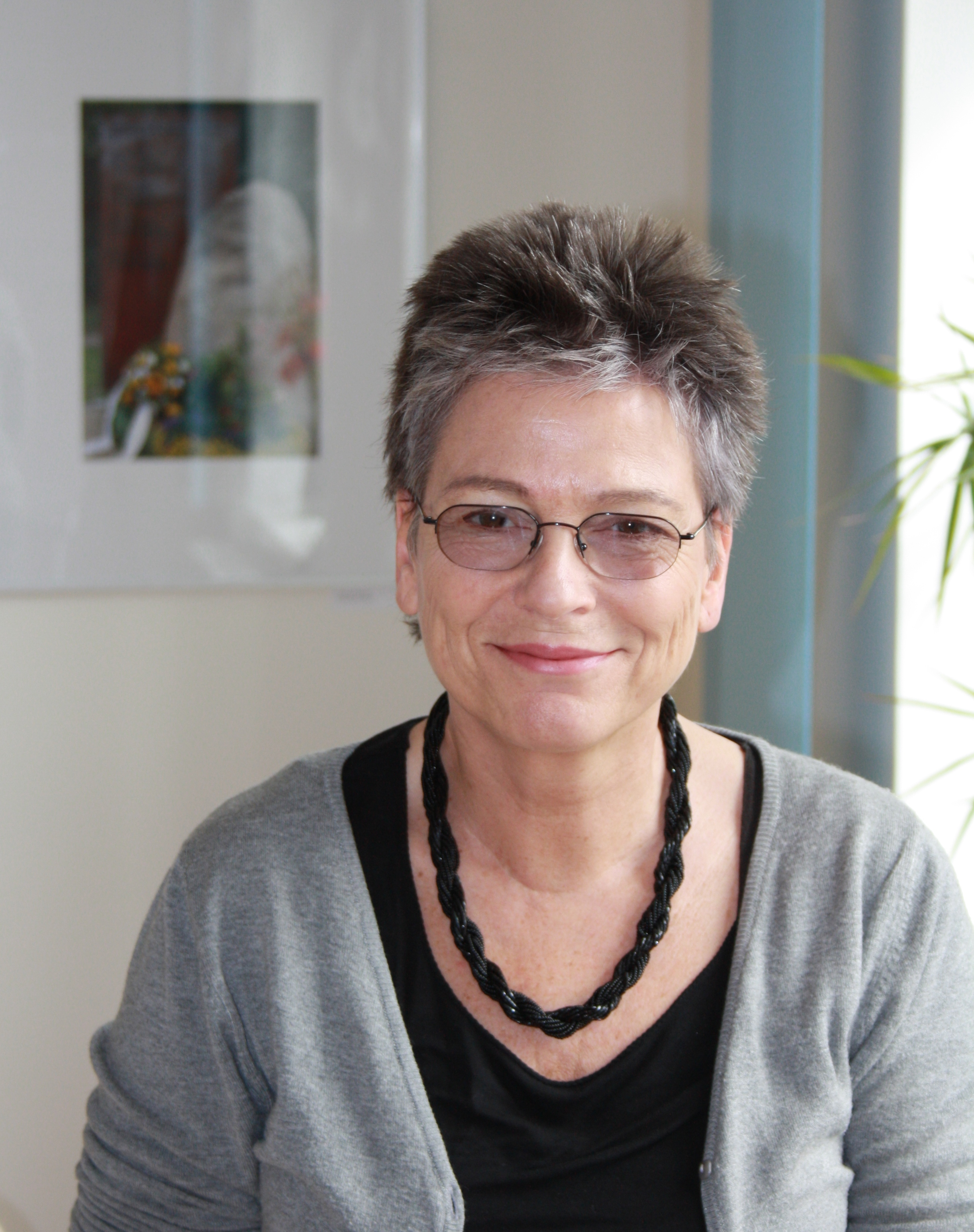
The first commissioner, Ulrike Poppe (since 2010).

The state elections of autumn 2009 led to the formation of a governing coalition by the Social Democrats and the Left Party ("Die Linke"). In the aftermath, concerns were raised that the discussion (“Aufarbeitung”) of the Socialist Unity Party (SED) dictatorship and its consequences would receive even less attention. Indeed, the subject had been strongly neglected in Brandenburg ever since the Peaceful Revolution, as the long-lived governments under Manfred Stolpe (SPD) had chosen to pursue a policy of indulgence towards former GDR and MfS (“Stasi”) officials. Despite attempts at appeasement - for instance, by outlining their historical policy in the coalition contract - the new government was threatening to lose even more of its credibility as a determined agent of “Aufarbeitung” when the media exposed the MfS implications of several Left Party deputies. Consequently, it was crucial for the state parliament to prove its willingness to come to terms with the past, which was eventually achieved through the nomination of a candidate as Brandenburg commissioner, the general submission of all MPs to an MfS check-up, and the establishment of a commission to assess Brandenburg’s socialist history and its transition to democracy.

=== Appointment of Ulrike Poppe as first commissioner ===
On 17 December 2009 the state parliament unanimously elected the former member of the GDR opposition and civil-rights activist Ulrike Poppe as Brandenburg’s first commissioner. Poppe officially began her six years’ term on 22 February 2010 and was solemnly introduced into her office on 23 March by the president of the state parliament Gunter Fritsch (SPD) at Cecilienhof Palace, Potsdam.

=== First amendment to the “Aufarbeitungsbeauftragtengesetz” ===
After the law’s coming into effect, the commissioner was subordinated to the Brandenburg Department for Education, Youth and Sports. However, on 26 February 2010 the state parliament passed a resolution by which the commissioner was transferred from the Department’s jurisdiction to that of the state parliament. This measure was designed to guarantee the commissioner’s independence from respective governments.

== Function ==
Para. 2 of the “Aufarbeitungsbeauftragtengesetz” defines the duties of the state commissioner. These can be summarised in three categories.

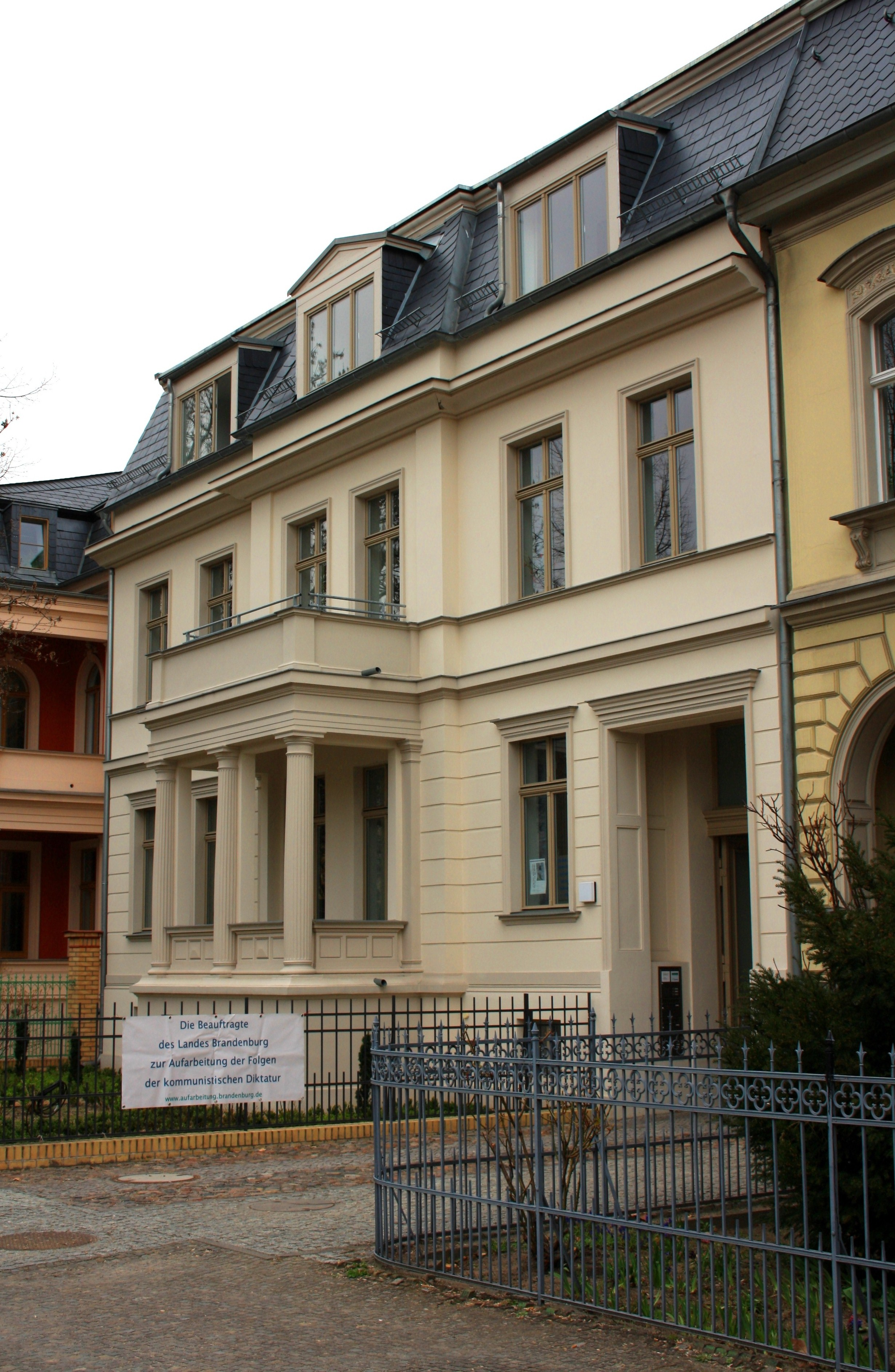
The LAkD office in central Potsdam (Hegelallee 3)

=== Advising citizens ===
The commissioner provides counsel for all those who seek clarification as to the history of the Soviet occupation zone and the GDR. Most of these will be victims of the regime requiring support with their application for access to MfS files about them (as per §§13-17 of the Stasi Records Act). The commissioner also assists victims of political persecution and their relatives during the procedures of rehabilitation and compensation as per the “SED-Unrechtsbereinigungsgesetze”, or by procuring financial or medical aid in case their political persecution has had lasting repercussions for their health.

=== Political and historical education ===
The commissioner is also responsible for informing the public about the workings of dictatorships, especially the socialist dictatorship in the Soviet occupation zone and the GDR. This is partly done in collaboration with victims’ associations, educational institutions and memorials.

=== Advising public offices on how to treat MfS records and to check employees and applicants ===
The commissioner also gives guidance to state institutions and other public offices wishing to assess the biographies of their employees and job applicants for collaboration with the MfS.

== First report (December 2009 – December 2011) ==
On 15 March 2012 Ulrike Poppe handed over her first report to the president of the state parliament, Gunter Fritsch. As per §4 of the “Aufarbeitungsbeauftragtengesetz” the commissioner must give the state parliament account of his or her work every other year.

According to the report, when the commissioner took her office, the greatest challenge lay in the backlog of victims in need of counselling. During the first two years a total of 1,977 persons consulted the commissioner for help. As to the report, many of the increasingly elderly victims are reluctant to seek counsel, fearing the lengthy application procedures before official recognition of their status as victims. Aware of this widespread hesitation, the commissioner suggested that the processors in charge treat their cases with greater sensitivity and advocated a so-called inversion of the evidence-taking procedure. In other words, if a board refuses to recognise a health problem as the effect of repression, it should no longer be the responsibility of the applicant to produce the counter-evidence but that of the board.

Further, the report summarises the projects supported by the commissioner and her collaboration with organisations and institutions, for instance in form of an oral history project with the Potsdam University of Applied Sciences, cooperation with several victims’ associations and the Federal Commissioner for the Stasi Records.
