= Werner Schulz =

German politician of Alliance '90 (1950–2022)

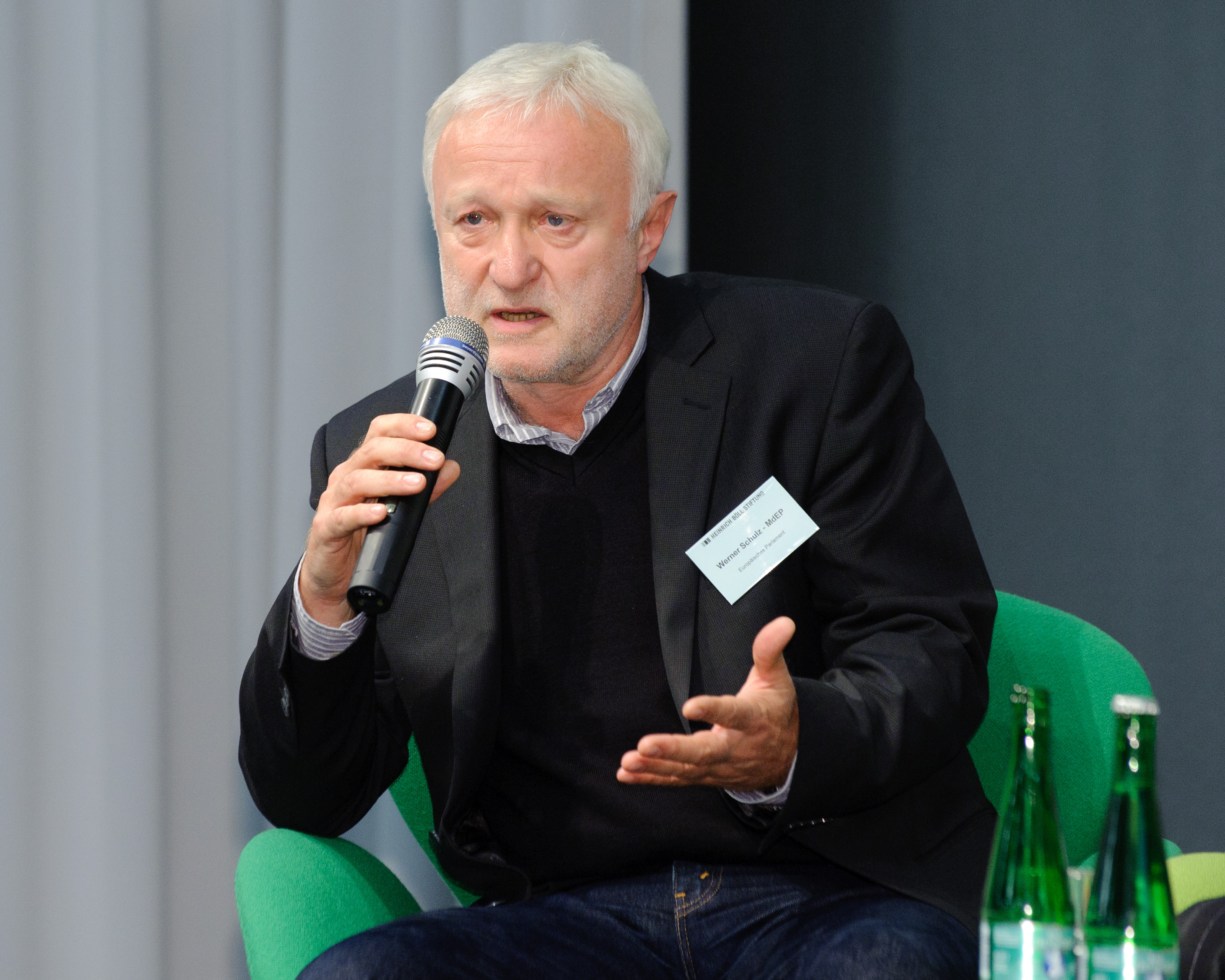
- Schulz in 2010
- Born: 22 January 1950; Zwickau, Saxony, East Germany
- Died: 9 November 2022 (aged 72); Berlin, Germany
- Occupations: Politician; member of Bundestag; member of the European Parliament
- Political party: Alliance '90/The Greens
- Awards: Order of Merit of the Federal Republic of Germany

Werner Gustav Schulz (22 January 1950 – 9 November 2022) was a German politician of Alliance '90/The Greens. Trained in food technology at the Humboldt University of Berlin, he worked as a research assistant. He was an activist for peace ecology and human rights in several oppositional groups from the 1970s. He lost his university job in 1980 when he protested against the Soviet Invasion of Afghanistan. In the Peaceful Revolution, he was in 1989 a founding member of the New Forum, representing the group at the Round Table. He was elected to the first freely elected Volkskammer. After German reunification, he was a member of the German Bundestag from 1990 to 2005, and a member of the European Parliament (MEP) from 2009 to 2014.

== Early life and career ==
Schulz was born in Zwickau, then part of East Germany, on 22 January 1950. He grew up there, the son of an independent haulage contractor and former professional officer from a social-democratic dominated family. From 1964 to 1968, he attended the Käthe-Kollwitz-Gymnasium. His father recommended him not to join the Young Pioneers.

Schulz received a degree in food technology at the Humboldt University of Berlin in 1974. From 1974 he worked as a research assistant at the university. He was dismissed in 1980 because he protested against the Soviet invasion of Afghanistan. He then worked as a research assistant at the Institut für Sekundärrohstoffwirtschaft, dealing with recycling technology. From 1988, he directed the department Umwelthygiene of the Kreishygieneinspektion Berlin-Lichtenberg.

== Political career ==
Schulz was active from the beginning in the Protestant church movements for peace, ecology and human rights. He was an activist in several oppositional groups from the 1970s, and a member of the Friedenskreis Pankow from 1982. During the Peaceful Revolution, he was a founding member of the New Forum in 1989, representing the group at the Round Table and contributing to its constitution.

Schulz became a member of the Green Party in Germany, elected to the first freely elected Volkskammer in 1990, where he served from March to October 1990 as speaker of his party. After the reunification of Germany, he was a member of the Bundestag until 2005, as his party's CEO in parliament (Parlamentarischer Geschäftsführer) from the beginning and its economic speaker from 1998.

In April 1998, Schulz ran for mayor of Leipzig. With 8.2 percent of the vote, he came fourth in the first round of voting. Schulz did not run in the second round; instead Wolfgang Tiefensee of the SPD was elected.

When Chancellor Gerhard Schröder engineered the loss of a no-confidence vote in Parliament and asked President Horst Köhler to allow an early vote in 2005, Schulz and Jelena Hoffmann of Schröder's Social Democrats filed a complaint before the Federal Constitutional Court against the dissolution of parliament. His speech was honoured as the Speech of the Year by the seminar of rhetoric of the University of Tübingen, with the jury saying that he used his limited time for a concise analysis and personal confession, although it was not immediately successful.

Schulz was vice president of the council of the Federal Foundation for the Reappraisal of the SED Dictatorship from 2003 to 2008, and a member of the board of the Deutscher Evangelischer Kirchentag from 2003 to 2009. In 2009, he was a founding member, together with Christian Führer and Friedrich Schorlemmer, and a member of the board of the Stiftung Friedliche Revolution (Foundation Peaceful Revolution) in Leipzig.

In a political come-back, Schulz became a Member of the European Parliament in 2009. He served until 2014, as vice chair of the delegation to the EU-Russia Parliamentary Cooperation Committee, as a member of the Committee on Foreign Affairs, and as a member of the parliament's delegation to the Euronest Parliamentary Assembly from 2012 to 2014, among others.

== Personal life ==
Schulz was married and the couple had two children. The family lived in the Boitzenburger Land in Brandenburg, where he founded a support association for his church parish.

Schulz died from a heart attack in Berlin on 9 November 2022, at age 72. He had been scheduled to speak at a memorial event at Schloss Bellevue where he collapsed.

== Recognition ==
Schulz was awarded the Order of Merit of the Federal Republic of Germany in 2015; President Joachim Gauck honoured him and others who had worked towards a united Germany on German Unity Day. In 2022, he was awarded the Deutscher Nationalpreis. Ex-President Gauck described Schulz as "a tireless fighter for a policy based on democratic values".

== Publications ==
- Schulz, Werner; Heinrich-Böll-Stiftung (2001). Der Bündnis-Fall : politische Perspektiven 10 Jahre nach Gründung des Bündnis 90 (in German). Bremen: Edition Temmen. ISBN 3-86108-796-0. OCLC 50052368.
- Schulz, Werner (29 June 2009). "'Was lange gärt wird Wut' - Der Vorlauf der DDR Opposition zur friedlichen Revolution". Die demokratische Revolution 1989 in der DDR. Köln: Böhlau Verlag. pp. 103–120. doi:10.7788/boehlau.9783412334949.103. ISBN 978-3-412-20462-4.
