= Almuth Berger =

German Protestant pastor

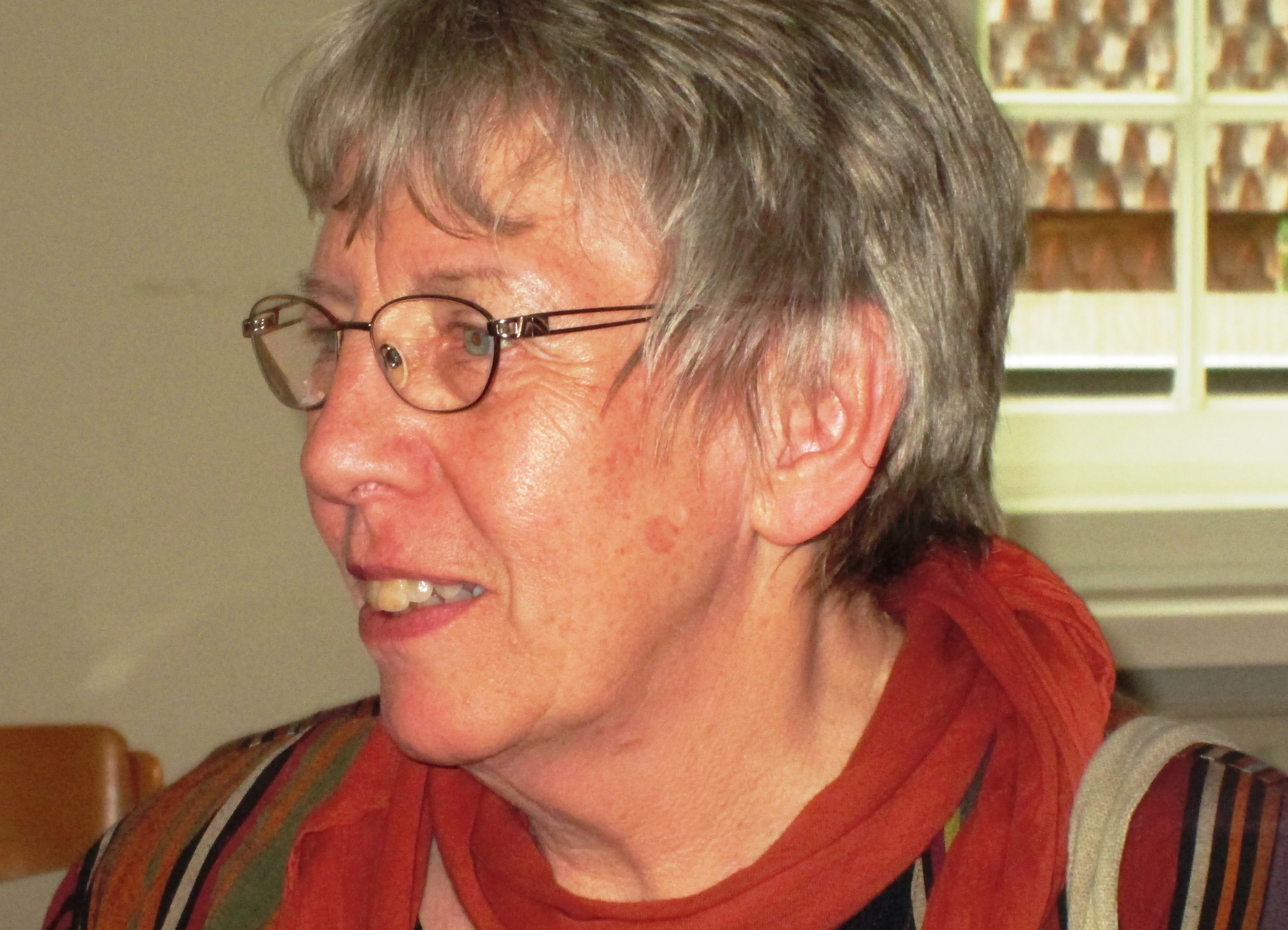
- Almuth Berger (2013)
- Born: Almuth Brennecke; 29 April 1943 (age 83); Tangermünde, Saxony-Anhalt, Germany
- Occupation: Protestant pastor
- Spouse: Christfried Berger (1938-2003)
- Children: 3

Almuth Berger is a German Protestant pastor.

In the 1970s she became a peace activist in the German Democratic Republic. In 1989, after several years campaigning on issues affecting immigrants, she was appointed "Commissioner for Foreigners" in the governments of Hans Modrow and Lothar de Maizière. Following reunification she took an equivalent position with the Brandenburg Regional Government between 1991 and 2006.

== Life ==
=== Early years ===
Almuth Brennecke was born in Tangermünde, a small town on the western bank of the Elbe, some two years before the end of the war. Later Tangermünde became known for footage taken in 1945 of refugees from what had been designated the Soviet occupation zone struggling to cross the river and reach the zone scheduled for military occupation by British troops, but the Brennecke family remained in what would later become the German Democratic Republic, and Almuth Brennecke grew up in nearby Jerichow on the east side of the river. Her parents were Protestant theologians. The Brenneckes later moved to Berlin where she studied Theology at the Humboldt University between 1961 and 1966. During this time she married the ecumenically minded theologian Christfried Berger. The church authorities were not enthusiastic about a married woman becoming a pastor and it was only in 1975, following the birth of the couples' three daughters, that she was able to complete her theological studies and become ordained.

=== Magdeburg pastorate and peace ===
"We wanted to encourage people and give them strength to stand up for peace and justice.”
"Wir wollten Menschen ermutigen und bestärken, sich für Gerechtigkeit und Frieden einzusetzen."

Almuth Berger talking about "Women for Peace"

In 1976 she relocated with her husband to Magdeburg where between 1976 and 1985 she was a member of the St. Michaelis pastorate. She was also an advocate for peace activism within the church during this time, participating in the city's "Peace Sundays". She was a founder member the Magdeburg branch of "Women for Peace". The Bergers returned in 1985 to Berlin where Almuth Berger joined the St Bartholomäus pastorate in Berlin's Friedrichshain quarter.

=== Berlin pastorate and immigrant support ===
In addition to her work for peace, from 1986 she worked increasingly on immigrant support and integration issues. In 1986 she came across a group of Christians from Mozambique in her parish and she made available a church room where they could conduct their own church services. This evolved into regular interdenominational meetings for which Berger learned Portuguese. The initiative became the "Cabana" ("little hut") movement, providing a meeting place in the parish where immigrants and people born in Germany could take the opportunity to get to know one another. The "Cabana" initiative became an exemplar for similar innovations in other East German cities.

=== Politics ===
In 1987 Almuth Berger took a leading role in creating a working group called "Rejection of the principal and practice of separation" ("Absage an Praxis und Prinzip der Abgrenzung"). By September 1989 this had grown into the better remembered "Democracy Now" movement. Although it was the travel restrictions separating East and West Germany, starkly represented and effected by the Berlin Wall, that generated the largest headlines, in the context of Berger's own long standing peace activism it was just as important to reject separation between other neighbouring European states and, especially within East Germany where she experienced each day the existing polarisation, to reject separation of the different racial groups. All these objectives featured on her agenda when she was drawn into national politics.

=== Government office ===
By 1989 the German Democratic Republic was home to approximately 85,000 immigrant workers from outside Europe. They came from the small number of poorer country's with which the country had reasonable diplomatic relations, notably Mozambique, Angola and Vietnam. There had, at government level, never been any policy to integrate the immigrants into the wider community. Their wages and living conditions were bad. In March 1990 the German Democratic Republic held its first (and, as matters turned out, last) free election, in the wake of which the situation of the immigrants suddenly appeared on the government's political agenda.

In her own understated estimation of her seven months in government, Almuth Berger wryly observed that she had had least ensured that 85,000 immigrants to East Germany
"were not slung out immediately after Reunification Day"
("nicht gleich nach dem Tag der Einheit hinausgeschmissen werden")

Almuth Berger as quoted in October 1990

As a "Democracy Now" leader Almuth Berger participated in the important working group discussions set up under the 1989/1990 Round Table process on immigrant issues (literally "Foreigner questions" / "Ausländerfragen"). Directly after the 1990 General Election she found herself a member of the government headed up by Hans Modrow (and after Modrow's resignation on 12 April 1990, by Lothar de Maizière). The breach of the Berlin Wall in November 1989, and the absence of any subsequent intervention by the Soviet occupation forces, had left the gate open for German reunification, and the new government's job was to prepare for that moment. Berger, although not an elected member of the National Legislature, was given the rank of a Secretary of State, together with responsibility Immigrant ("Foreigner") Issues. She held the national post for only seven months, but she fought for her beliefs and saw to it that the interests of the East German immigrant community were not overlooked in the rush to reunification,.

At the start of the twenty-first century the label by which Almuth Berger's governmental areas of responsibility had been defined changed from "Commissioner for Foreigner issues" (...."Ausländerfragen") to "Commissioner for Integration" (...."Integration"). The change was made at different times in different regional governments: in the Berlin senate itself it came about only in 2003. Many current sources continue to apply the former term, "Ausländerfragen". The issues and decisions involved changed even less abruptly than the term used, and the English language term "Immigrant Issues" appears to cover the responsibilities for present purposes. The Reunification Treaty took effect on 3 October 1990, which marked the end of the German Democratic Republic as a separate entity, and thereby put an end to the East German government of which Almuth Berger was a member. However, in 1991 she was appointed "Commissioner for Immigrant Issues "("Integrationsbeauftragterin" / "Ausländerbeauftragterin") in the regional government of Brandenburg. She retained this position for fifteen years, until her retirement in 2006. Although the job in regional politics gave her a lower public profile than the period in national politics, it nevertheless covered a period which she would describe as a continuation of the "most intense and exciting period of her life" (" intensivste und spannendste Zeit ihres Lebens").

Almuth Berger retired to Schmöckwitz (on the southern side of Berlin) in October 2006, but remains actively engaged at a parish and community level.
