= Christfried Berger =

German Protestant theologian

- Born: 7 January 1938; Posen, Germany
- Died: 19 November 2003; Berlin, Germany
- Occupation(s): Protestant theologian and pastor
- Spouse(s): Almuth Berger (born Almuth Brennecke)

Christfried Berger (7 January 1938 – 19 November 2003) was a Protestant theologian in the German Democratic Republic and subsequently, in Germany following reunification. He was a leading ecumenist.

== Life ==
Berger was born in Posen, at that time a major industrial city in the heart of eastern Germany. After 1945 the family lived in Thuringia, now part of the Soviet occupation zone of Germany, which eventually became East Germany. Berger studied Protestant Theology at Berlin's Humboldt University between 1956 and 1961.

He was ordained in 1963. After this, between 1964 and 1966, he became the first ordained minister for alternative military service in a unit of the National People's Army, which had been established in 1956 and was heavily dependent on "national service" conscription. He subsequently created and for many years led the illegal convention of former non-fighting "Construction soldiers" in the German Democratic Republic. By doing this he attracted an intense and sustained programme of "observation" from officers of the ubiquitous Ministry for State Security and their collaborators in what, since October 1949, had been the Soviet sponsored German Democratic Republic.

It was also during the early 1960s that Christfried Berger married a fellow theologian-minister called Almuth Brennecke.

Between 1966 and 1974 he served as an evangelical pastor in the Schmöckwitz district in the southern part of Berlin. After that he became senior consistory counsellor and advisor for ecumenism, mission and charity of the Evangelical Consistory for the church province of Saxony, based in Magdeburg. From 1979-1980 he worked for a number of months for the Dialogue Department of the Geneva based World Council of Churches.

In 1985 Berger was appointed Director of the Ecumenical Missionary Centre of the Berlin Missionary Society. During the defining closing months of late 1989 and early 1990, Christfried Berger chaired the Foreign Policy Working Group of the East German Round Table exercise. Following reunification, which took place in October 1990, he headed up the Ecumenical Missionary Institute of Berlin's Ecumenical Council until his retirement in 1997.
