= Federal Foundation for the Reappraisal of the SED Dictatorship =

German organisation that studies East Germany

- Bundesstiftung zur Aufarbeitung der SED-Diktatur
- Foundation logo: East German flag with the emblem cut out.

Agency overview
- Formed: 5 June 1998
- Jurisdiction: Government of Germany
- Headquarters: Berlin
- Website: www.bundesstiftung-aufarbeitung.de

The Federal Foundation for the Reappraisal of the SED Dictatorship (German: Bundesstiftung zur Aufarbeitung der SED-Diktatur, alternatively translated as "(Federal) Foundation for the Study of Communist Dictatorship in East Germany") is an organisation that assesses the history of the socialist regime of the German Democratic Republic (GDR, commonly known as East Germany), and its impact on the now reunified Germany. The organisation is government-funded organisation and was established in 1998 by the German parliament.

As its logo, the foundation uses the former East German flag minus its coat of arms. In the final months of the GDR, many East German citizens cut out the flag's emblem in this manner.

The foundation also initiated a project "Aufbruch 1989" in which 17 organisations cooperated, including the Rosa Luxemburg Foundation which is affiliated with the SED successor party, Die Linke. This sparked controversy because critics argued that involving an institution linked to the former ruling party risked undermining the foundation’s mission to critically examine the SED dictatorship. This cooperatirejwas ected by Hubertus Knabe, and after it was made public, by a public letter signed by Bärbel Bohley, Werner Schulz, Lutz Rathenow, Joachim Walther, Ralph Giordano, Erich Loest and others, with support by Lea Rosh and Michael Wolffsohn.
