= Christfried =

Christfried is a Germanic masculine given name, composed of the components "Christ" and "fried" (from Old High German fridu meaning peace). Nowadays the name is rarely given. Notable people with this name include:

- Christfried Berger (1938–2003), German Protestant theologian
- Christfried Böttrich (born 1959), German Protestant theologian
- Christfried Burmeister (1898–1965), Estonian speed skater and bandy player
- Christfried Ganander (1741–1790), Finnish compiler of folk culture, priest and lexicographer
- Christfried Kirch (1694–1740), German astronomer and almanac publisher
- Christfried Schmidt (1932–2025), German composer and arrangeur
- Michael-Christfried Winkler (born 1946), German organist, conductor and academic teacher
