= Rolf Henrich =

German writer, layer, and politician

- Born: 24 February 1944 (age 82); Magdeburg, Saxony-Anhalt, Germany
- Occupations: Writer, lawyer, politician
- Political party: SED (1964); NF (1989); SPD (1990)
- Spouse: Heidelore
- Children: 1

Rolf Henrich (born 24 February 1944) is a writer and lawyer. In September 1989 he became a co-founder and leading member of the New Forum movement.

His book "The Custodial State. On the Failure of Real-life Socialism" ("Der vormundschaftliche Staat. Vom Versagen des real existierenden Sozialismus") had appeared in April 1989 and was a powerful stimulus along the route to the Citizens' Movement that within a couple of years had led to the end of the German Democratic Republic as a standalone state.

== Life ==
=== Early years ===
Henrich was born in Magdeburg, roughly equidistant between Hanover and Berlin, and on the eastern side of the border that divided East Germany from West Germany. After successfully completing his school career he went on to study law at the Humboldt University in Berlin. At the age of 20 he joined the country's ruling SED (party) and three years later he became an Informal collaborator (IM / Informeller Mitarbeiter) for the Ministry for State Security (Stasi). Between 1964 and 1969 he is listed as an IM in the Stasi files under the code name "IM Streit".

=== The student ===
Twenty years later he would describe himself at age 20 as having joined the SED "out of conviction": "Back then", he later recalled, he was "even a bit fanatical" A powerful adumbration of future disenchantment with the East German regime nevertheless came in 1968, in the context of student discussions of the Prague Spring when he was officially reprimanded for "revisionism" and "psychologizing the law", and suffered the withdrawal of a previously agreed research scholarship. He was also required to change the subject of his dissertation, now addressing the subject "The next tasks of Soviet power" ("Die nächsten Aufgaben der Sowjetmacht"): he nevertheless accomplished his own task, receiving his degree-diploma with a top grade.

=== The young lawyer ===
After receiving his law degree Henrich went on to perform his Military service in the National People's Army before taking a post as a research assistant at the prestigious "Walter Ulbricht" German Legal Academy (as it was known at the time) in the Babelsberg quarter of Potsdam. In 1973 he set himself up as a lawyer in Eisenhüttenstadt. Here he supported The Party within the local "Collective of Lawyers" ("Kollegium der Rechtsanwälte") as Party Secretary. During this period he also undertook further studies, almost certainly of a political nature, at the regional party academy in Frankfurt (on the River Oder).

=== Growing disenchantment ===
The arrest of Rudolf Bahro in 1977 affected Henrich deeply and he slowly became increasingly disillusioned with the East German regime and its Soviet-style Socialism, composing several highly critical essays (which remained unpublished). He would later recall his disenchantment, which had set in and then developed ever since he started to practice in Eisenhüttenstadt, with the way the law was applied in the German Democratic Republic. Nevertheless, Rolf Henrich remained a relatively discrete dissident through the early 1980s. He himself later spoke of the need he had experienced slowly to free himself from the old dogmatism as a laborious process of internal conflict. He did, however, attract the interest of the Ministry for State Security whose principal office in Eisenhüttenstadt was in the Bergstraße ("Mountain Street"), close to his own office. For approximately two years, starting in 1987, the camera installed to monitor people entering and leaving the Ministry was positioned so that it could periodically swing round and point directly at Henrich's desk, through his office window across the road.

=== Into the limelight ===
Henrich's public profile was greatly raised with the publication in April 1989 of his book "The Custodial State. On the Failure of Real-life Socialism" ("Der vormundschaftliche Staat. Vom Versagen des real existierenden Sozialismus") There was at this time no question of anything so critical of the regime being published in East Germany: the book was published in West Germany where it received wide coverage in the broadcast and print media. The book's publication evidently came as a surprise to the authorities. It presented a devastating and detailed criticism of a state where socialism had not progressed beyond the "larval stage" ("Sozialismus im Larvenstadium") and the security services felt free to operate outside the law. In some ways it was a conscious follow-up to "The Alternative", the publication of which in 1977 had led to its author's arrest and subsequent deportation, but twelve years on Rolf Heinrich was much more analytically pessimistic about the way ahead for Socialism in the German Democratic Republic than Rudolf Bahro had been. In East Germany Henrich was expelled from the ruling SED (party) and excluded from the "Collective of Lawyers" ("Kollegium der Rechtsanwälte") which effectively terminated, for the time being, his legal career in Eisenhüttenstadt. The widespread assumption was that Rolf Henrich, like Bahro, would now be arrested and then deported or "sold" to the west. That did not happen this time, however, possibly because behind the scenes the East Germany leadership hardliners were themselves struggling with a loss of self-confidence resulting from the political loosening now under way in the Soviet Union itself. Another explanation is that the regime was aware of the scale of the publicity Heinrich's book had already received both within and outside the German Democratic Republic and did not arrest him "for political reasons".

=== New Forum ===
Early in September 1989, at Grünheide, Rolf Henrich was one of the 30 signatories of the founding proclamation that gave birth to the New Forum movement. By the end of 1989 more than 200,000 had signed the proclamation despite New Forum having been identified by the East German governing party as illegal. By this time, in any event, the Berlin wall had been breached by demonstrators on the eastern side early in November 1989, and when it became clear that the fraternal Soviet troops had no instructions to prevent people from crossing it, the gate was seen to have been left open for a reunification process that now appeared unstoppable.

Rolf Henrich: Published Works

- Der vormundschaftliche Staat. Vom Versagen des real existierenden Sozialismus. Rowohlt Verlag Hamburg 1989, ISBN 3-499-12536-6
- Gewalt und Form in einer vulkanischen Welt, Aufsätze 1991–96. Berlin 1996, ISBN 3-932458-01-X
- Die Schlinge. Eichborn Verlag Frankfurt/Main 2001, ISBN 3-8218-0707-5 (his first novel)

As part of that process, between December 1989 and March 1990 a Round Table forum was convened to work through the practical steps needed for German reunification. Rolf Henrich participated in the Round Table discussions on behalf of New Forum. Henrich set himself two principal tasks within the process. The hated Ministry for State Security had to be abolished. There had been some suggestion that the institution might be reconfigured as a new "National Security Agency" ("Amt für Nationale Sicherheit"). For Henrich, that would have been a mere re-labeling and as such totally unacceptable. His second task was to help draft and enact a new election law for East Germany, and to set a date for a democratically configured election to take place. On 18 March 1990 the first, and as matters turned out, last, free parliamentary election in the history of the German Democratic Republic was held. After this Rolf Henrich was satisfied that his own contribution to the Round Table exercise had been successfully completed. In November 1989 the de facto ban that seven months earlier had prevented him from working as a lawyer had been revoked and he was by now free to return to work at his lawyer's office in Eisenhüttenstadt.

=== Career options ===
Henrich later told an interviewer that Manfred Gerlach, who had been the East German head of state between 3 December 1989 and 18 March 1990, had offered him a job as President of the country's Supreme Court, but Henrich turned down that job along with an invitation to take a government post as secretary of state in the Ministry of Justice. Henrich evidently thought he might have independence issues or become a "figleaf" with a high-profile post in the East German judicial-political establishment. To maximize legitimacy, such jobs should go to an "outsider".

There had also been a project involving the Gruner + Jahr publishing conglomerate to set up a pan-regional daily newspaper called "Die Ostdeutsche", based on the model of the highly successful Süddeutsche Zeitung. That project failed because the newspaper market turned out to be overcrowded already.

German reunification formally took place in October 1990 and Rolf Henrich returned to his life as a provincial lawyer in Eisenhüttenstadt. His public profile never entirely vanished, however: he continued to give occasional press interviews and to publish the occasional book. In the courts he has worked as a defense lawyer in controversial cases including those involving former East German border guards charged in connection with shootings at the Berlin Wall.

== Awards and honours ==
- 2000 German National prize of the German National Foundation (joint winner)
