= Salomea Genin =

German writer (born 1932)

Salomea Genin (born August 31, 1932) is a German book author.

== Childhood, Youth & Adult ==
Salomea Genin was born in the Jewish Hospital in Berlin-Wedding. At birth, her name was Salomea, but her mother was warned that with such a Jewish name she would have problems at school. It was then decided to call her Loni. She was the third daughter of Polish-Russian Jewish parents. Her father, Abraham Genin, was a printer by trade. In the twenties he used his knowledge to conterfiet money and was jailed for 3 years in Berlin. Her mother, Shayndl, divorced him in 1937 and he left for Shanghai shortly afterwards. In 1938, Salomea's oldest sister had to flee Germany because she was denounced to the police that she was in a relationship with a young non-Jewish German, which was punishable with two years in jail. In May 1939 Shayndl and her two youngest daughters escaped the Nazis thanks to the financial support of the Jewish Community. An uncle in Australia had sent an affidavit which made it possible to obtain a visa for Australia. Loni/Salomea never saw her father again. Shayndl and her daughters lived in Melbourne. In 1944 Salomea joined the Young Communist League and became a member in 1949 of the Communist Party of Australia, when it was about to be banned, which was prevented.

In 1951 Salomea was a member of the Australian delegation to the 3. World Festival of Youth and Students for Peace in East Berlin. She decided then that she wanted to live in East Berlin, but first had to return to Australia.

In 1954 Salomea returned to West Berlin and applied to live in East Berlin, but her application was ignored. Thus, she stayed in West Berlin, found work and an apartment and tried for 9 years to get a residence permit for East Germany (GDR). In 1958, Salomea worked as a secretary for the Action Reconciliation Service for Peace. During this time she agreed to cooperate with the Ministry for State Security of the GDR, because she was convinced of the justice of the socialist system. In 1963, still living in West Berlin with her Australian passport, she had a nervous breakdown and was then allowed shift to East Berlin.

== Life in East Berlin ==
Salomea Genin worked as a translator for Radio Berlin International, the foreign broadcasting station of the German Democratic Republic and joined the "SED", the Socialist Party of GDR. During the next few years she experienced the contrast between the theory of Marxism and the realities of socialism. In 1982 she realized, that she had helped to create a police state and became suicidal, but she had two children which saved her life. From 1985, three years of psychotherapy helped her to understand why she had done this. In May 1989 Salomea left the SED and in September 89 joined the new citizens' movement "Neues Forum", an organisation which was decisive for the collapse of the GDR.

== Life in United Germany ==
For the first time in her life, Salomea took an interest in her family story and what it means to be Jewish. She did research into her family in Lemberg, where her mother was born. Her grandfather was deeply religious. Twenty-nine members of her family in Galicia were murdered by the German Nazis. Her first book, "Shayndl & Salomea", tells the story of her family in Lemberg and how her parents came to Berlin in 1928. In her second book "Ich folgte den falschen Göttern", published at 2009, Salomea describes her life in the GDR and her contact to the "Staatssicherheit". She describes the effect of her early childhood experiences for her later life, when her mother had no time and not enough love for her youngest daughter under the conditions for Jews in a fascist system. Salomea became conscious of why she had always searched for love and recognition and every thing, that little Loni had lacked as a child. Therefore, Salomea now dedicates most of her time to speaking about her experiences in two dictatorships. She is committed to an open and democratic society without racism and anti-Semitism. Salomea Genin worked for 25 years to have a memorial installed beside the Marien Church in Berlin-Mitte which commemorates a pogrom against Jews in the 17th century.

== Artistic activities ==
For many years, Salomea Genin talked her life story together and sang Jewish songs, for instance, for some ten years at the private theater "Hackesches Hoftheater" in Berlin-Mitte, together with Karsten Troyke.

She often speaks to youngsters in schools and other places as a witness to contemporary history.

== Publications ==
- Scheindl und Salomea, 1992 by Fischer Taschenbuch, 2014 republished by Verlag Berlin Brandenburg, ISBN 978-3-942476-98-0
- Shayndl & Salomea, From Lemberg to Berlin, 1997 published by Northwestern University Press in the United States of America, ISBN 0-8101-1168-3
- Ich folgte den falschen Göttern - eine australische Jüdin in der DDR, 2009 by Verlag Berlin Brandenburg, ISBN 978-3-942476-35-5
- Salomea talks about her life: I came to the GDR as a communist - and found my way back to my Jewish roots, Interview, sound, editing, cover photo by Gabriele Diedrich. Paul-Lazarus-Stiftung, Wiesbaden 2012, ISBN 978-3-942902-04-5, 2 CDs (138 Min.), booklet

== Films ==
- Sein ist Anderssein (1996 dokumentary film), Director: Róza Berger-Fiedler, on behalf of SWR Baden-Baden, Interview with S. Genin about Jewish quarter
- Schalom neues Deutschland – Juden in der DDR (2018, documentary film), Directors: Tom Franke, Mark Chaet, Lutz Rentner (in German)
- Salomea (2025, documentary film), Director: Miriam Pfeiffer (in German)
