= Democracy Now (East Germany) =

Political movement

Democracy Now Demokratie Jetzt
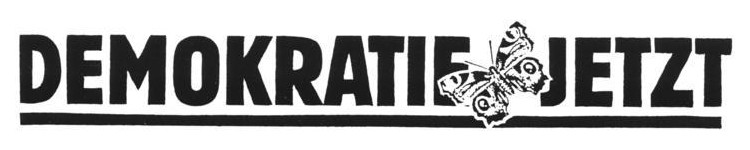
- The party logo prior to 1990
- Founded: 12 September 1989
- Merged into: Alliance 90
- Ideology: Democratic socialism

Democracy Now (German: Demokratie Jetzt) was a political movement which emerged in East Germany at the time of German reunification, which it helped significantly to shape. It was officially founded on 12 September 1989 and merged with sections of the Neue Forum ("New Forum") and the Initiative Frieden und Menschenrechte ("Initiative for Peace and Human Rights") to form Bündnis 90 ("Alliance 90") in 1991.

== Historical background ==
Democracy Now had its roots in a working party of St. Bartholomew's Evangelical Church (German: St.-Bartholomäus-Kirche) in Berlin called Initiative für Absage an Praxis und Prinzip der Abgrenzung ("Initiative for the Repudiation of the Practice and Principle of Separation"). In April 1987, the Initiative made an application to the synod of Protestant Churches in Berlin-Brandenburg to pronounce a repudiation of the practice and principle of separation and, at the same time, to make the case for a series of political demands, such as freedom to travel. In its wording, this recalled a 1983 pronouncement of the Federation of Protestant Churches in the German Democratic Republic calling for peace and the "repudiation of the spirit, logic and practice of deterrence". After the synod had presented the application, initially at two of its committees and then for discussion among its congregations, the working party called for discussion of the issue among all East German Christians. Seminars on the issue were subsequently held. Both synods of the Federation of Protestant Churches in the German Democratic Republic held in September 1987 and September 1988 addressed the issue of societal separation. On 13 August 1989, the 28th anniversary of the construction of the Berlin Wall, an event was held in the Confessional Church (Bekenntniskirche) in the former Berlin borough of Treptow, in which a member of the working party, Hans-Jürgen Fischbeck, demanded the creation of an opposition, coalition movement in favour of democratic reform in East Germany.

== Founding proclamation ==
On 12 September 1989, the founding proclamation of Democracy Now, Aufruf zur Einmischung in eigener Sache ("Appeal for Personal Intervention"), was signed by 12 members of the Berlin working party. Among them were the physicist and synod member, Hans-Jürgen Fischbeck; Ulrike Poppe, one of the founder members of the organisation, Frauen für den Frieden ("Women for Peace"); the church historian, Dr. Wolfgang Ullmann; and the film director, Konrad Weiß. The proclamation began with the sentence, "Our country is living in a state of internal strife", and went on to describe the situation in East Germany in several paragraphs. The founding of the people's movement "Democracy Now" was called for, listing its general objectives as: a "society build on solidarity", "freedom and human rights for all", a "living pluralism", the rule of law, and harmony between the economy and ecology. At a meeting of representatives in early 1990, a manifesto was to be decided, and a list of candidates for the next Volkskammer ("People's Chamber") elections was to be sought.

"Theses for democratic transformation in East Germany" were attached to the proclamation and these made a number of concrete, political demands for the democratisation of the state and economy, the decoupling of state and society, as well as ecological transformation. The reunification of Germany was also listed as an objective: "We invite Germans in the Federal Republic to work towards a transformation of their society, such that it will enable a new unity among the German People within the community of Europe. For the sake of unity, both German states should reform themselves."

== History ==
At the end of October 1989, Democracy Now started a petition to change Article 1 of the national constitution, which enshrined the leadership claim of the Socialist Unity Party of Germany (SED). In November, Democracy Now circulated its proposal for a "four-sided table" which would include representatives of the Socialist Unity Party of Germany, the Democratic Bloc, and members of the church and citizens' rights movements. In December, this proposal was realised in the form of the Central Round Table. Two representatives of Democracy Now sat at the Round Table, which met from December onwards. Its spokespersons were Hans-Jürgen Fischbeck, Ulrike Poppe, Konrad Weiß and Wolfgang Ullmann.

At the Volkskammer Elections in 1990, Democracy Now formed an electoral alliance with the Neue Forum and Initiative Frieden und Menschenrechte, receiving 2.9% of the vote and obtaining 12 of the 400 seats. Together with the eight elected representatives of the East German Green Party, they formed the Bündnis 90/Grüne faction. Democracy Now stood for an eco-social market economy, for the rule of law and for the reunification of German in three phases (rapprochement, confederation, federation).

On 21 September 1991 in Potsdam, Democracy Now, sections of the Neue Forum, and Initiative Frieden und Menschenrechte formed Bündnis 90 as a political party, going on to merge with the Greens in May 1993. The state association "Bündnis 90/Die Grünen in Sachsen" was formed in Saxony in September 1991.

== Prominent members ==
Almuth Berger, Stephan Bickhardt, Hans-Jürgen Fischbeck, Katrin Göring-Eckardt, Regine Hildebrandt, Ludwig Mehlhorn, Ulrike Poppe, Wolfgang Tiefensee, Wolfgang Ullmann, Konrad Weiß.
