= Christian Führer =

German pastor and activist (1943–2014)

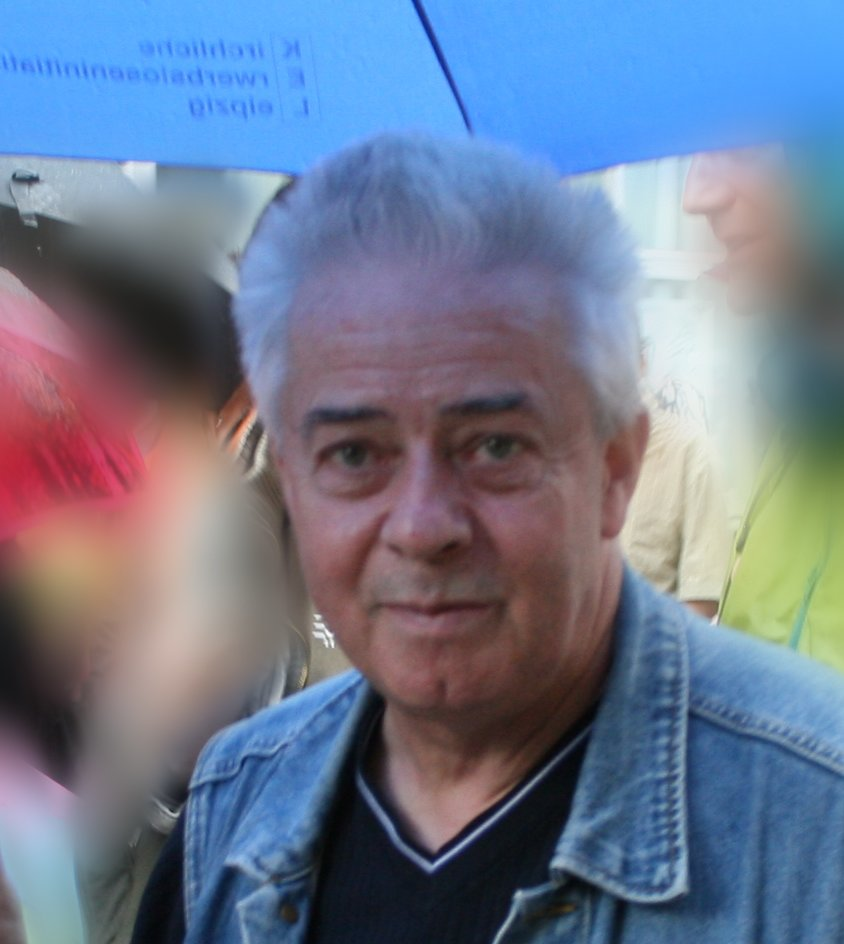
- Führer in 2008
- Born: 5 March 1943; Leipzig, Germany
- Died: 30 June 2014 (aged 71); Leipzig, Germany
- Occupation: Pastor
- Known for: Leading figure during the Monday demonstrations in East Germany

Christian Führer (5 March 1943 – 30 June 2014) was a Protestant pastor and one of the leading figures and organisers of the 1989 Monday demonstrations in East Germany which finally led to German reunification and the end of the GDR in 1990.

== Life ==
Führer grew up in Langenleuba-Oberhain, Saxony. He studied theology from 1961 until 1966 at the University of Leipzig. He worked as a pastor in Colditz until 1980 when he became the pastor of the Nikolaikirche in Leipzig. He retired on 4 July 2008.

== Peace prayers ("Friedensgebete") ==
In 1980 Führer helped to organize "peace prayers" (German: Friedensgebete) as part of a joint protest action of Protestant youth organisations. Starting on 20 September 1982, the peace prayers were held every Monday in the Nikolai Church in Leipzig focusing against the Cold War.

In 1987 he organized a pilgrimage in the context of the Olof Palme Peace March. In 1988 he moderated prayers for the arrested protesters of the Liebknecht-Luxemburg-Demonstrations (regular demonstrations in memory of the murdered socialists Karl Liebknecht and Rosa Luxemburg).

On 19 February 1988 Führer held a speech Living and Staying in the GDR (Leben und Bleiben in der DDR) in the Nikolai Church. Many opposition members attended the speech which marks a special date of east German resistance against the Honecker Regime.

== Peaceful East German revolution, 1989 ==
During the first months of 1989 the East German authorities, especially the Stasi, imposed increasing pressure to stop the Peace Prayers in Leipzig. They controlled access roads and arrested random "suspects" inside and outside the church. However, they were unsuccessful: the Monday prayers continued with an increasing number of attendees.

On 9 October troops of the army, police and Stasi officers arrived in front of the church. About 1,000 members of the SED were ordered into the church. Near the end of the Peace Prayers a manifesto was read out, written by Kurt Masur, Bernd-Lutz Lange, Peter Zimmermann, and three low-ranking leaders of the SED (later called The Leipzig Six: Die Leipziger Sechs), appealing to all attendees not to use force and to stay peaceful. The demonstration of about 70,000 people which followed the prayers was nonviolent.

The slogan "No Violence!" (Keine Gewalt!) was used by more than 300,000 people during the following demonstrations. The entire East German revolution remained peaceful.

== After reunification ==
After 1989 Führer became an advocate for unemployed people; he was a co-founder of the "Church Initiative for the Jobless, Leipzig" (Kirchliche Erwerbsloseninitiative Leipzig). In 2004 he again organized Monday demonstrations against the dismantling of the welfare state and the Hartz IV reforms. He also continued to hold regular Peace Prayers.

On 30 March 2008 he held his final service in the Nikolai Church and retired.

== Death ==
Führer died on 30 June 2014 from respiratory failure at the age of 71.

== Prizes and awards ==
- 1991: Theodor-Heuss-Prize, together with Joachim Gauck, Ulrike Poppe and Jens Reich
- 2002: Johann-Philipp-Palm-Prize
- 2004: Goldene Henne, Held der Wende (Hero of the Change)
- 2005: Peaceprize of Augsburg (together with Mikhail Gorbachev)

== See also ==
- Die Wende ("The Change"), the beginning of German reunification
- Berlin Wall
- History of Germany since 1945

== Media ==
- 2002 The Burning Wall
- 2007 Christian Führer speech on a demonstration, video (13 July 2006) on YouTube

== Literature ==
- Nikolaikirche, offen für alle by Karl Czok, Christian Führer, Friedrich Magirius, Evangelische Verlagsanstalt 1999 ISBN 3-374-01740-1
- Nikolaikirche by Erich Loest 1995 ISBN 3-88243-382-5
- Voices in Times of Change: The Role of Writers, Opposition Movements and the Churches in the Transformation of East Germany (Culture and Society in Germany Vol 3) by David Rock 1999 ISBN 978-1-57181-959-8
- Berlin Witness: An American Diplomat's Chronicle of East Germany's Revolution by G. Jonathan Greenwald 1993 ISBN 0-271-00932-2
- Leipzig by Tobias Gohlis 2004 ISBN 3-7701-6072-X
- Leipziger Ring: Aufzeichnungen eines Montagsdemonstranten 1989/1990 by Reiner Tetzner 2004 ISBN 3-932558-98-7
- Hermann Geyer: Nikolaikirche, montags um fünf: die politischen Gottesdienste der Wendezeit in Leipzig. Wissenschaftliche Buchgesellschaft, Darmstadt, 2007 (Universität Leipzig, Habil.-Schr. 2006), ISBN 978-3-534-18482-8, Inhaltsverzeichnis.
- Christian Führer: Und wir sind dabei gewesen. Ullstein, Berlin 2008, ISBN 978-3-550-08746-2.
- "Keine Gewalt! No Violence! How the Church Gave Birth to Germany's Only Peaceful Revolution" by Roger Newell, Wipf and Stock (October 4, 2017) ISBN 978-1532612824

== Sources ==
- BBC UK, Leipzig revives protest tradition, 17 March 2003
- Christian Führer at IMDb
- New York Times, A Clergyman of the Streets Leaves His Historic Pulpit, 12 January 2008
- Rev. Dr. Ian Ritchie, CHRISTIANITY AND CULTURE, Fall of Berlin Wall a Blessing of Faith
- Evangelic Church Saxony, Chronicle of GDR 1981–1990, German
- Christian Dietrich und Uwe Schwabe (Hrsg. im Auftrag des Archives Bürgerbewegung e.V. Leipzig): FREUNDE UND FEINDE. Friedensgebete in Leipzig zwischen 1981 und dem 9. Oktober 1989. Dokumentation. Mit einem Vorwort von Harald Wagner, Leipzig, Evangelische Verlagsanstalt, 1994, ISBN 3-374-01551-4.
- Interview with Prof. Hans-Werner Sinn, President of the IFO Institute for Economy Research, German
- Kirchliche Erwerbsloseninitiative Leipzig (Church Initiative for the Jobless, Leipzig)
