= Wolfgang Templin =

German politician and publicist

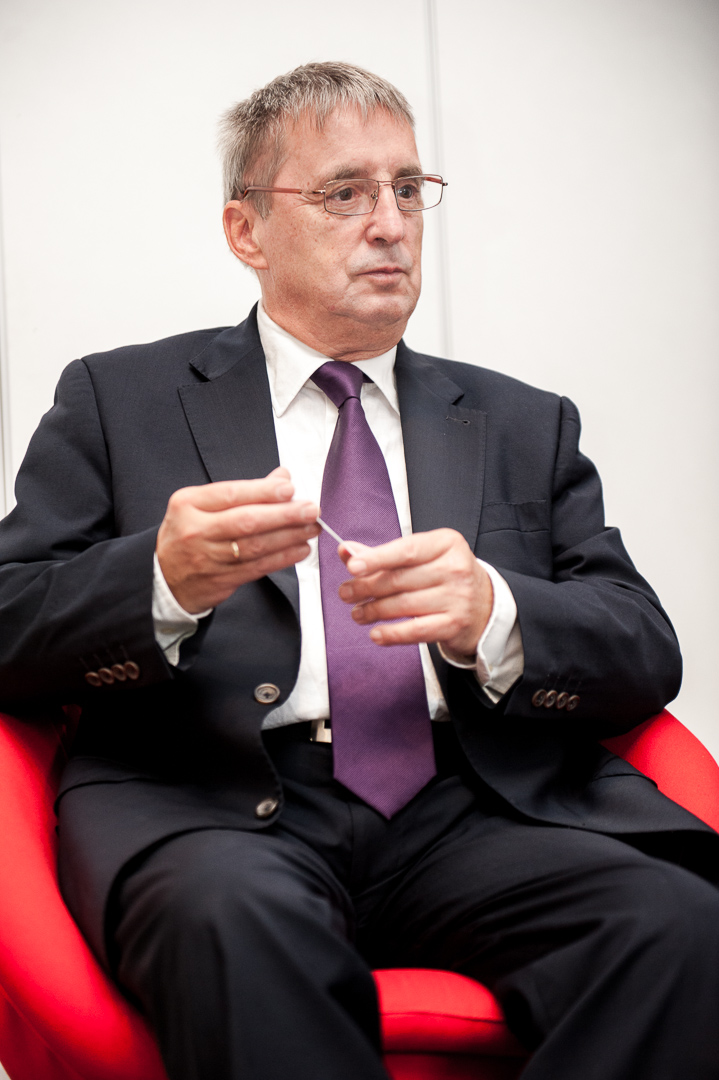
Wolfgang Templin - Europeana 1989

Wolfgang Templin (born in 1948) is a former politician of the democratic opposition in East Germany and publicist concerned with the history of the GDR, the former Eastern Bloc and the German reunification.

== Career ==
From 1973 to 1975, he was a Stasi informer under the codename "Peter". Later, Templin was a victim of the Stasi's Zersetzung psychological warfare program, which he sought to expose to the public with modest success. In 1985 he co-founded the Initiative for Peace and Human Rights. He published in the underground journal “Grenzfall”, cooperated with opposition in Eastern Europe and integrated environmental and pacifist groups in the GDR. After the fall of the Berlin Wall, he took part in the Round Table discussions.

He was a member of the Alliance 90 faction in the People's Chamber and a co-founder of the Alliance 90 party. From 1994-96 he was a research worker at the Berlin Wall Museum, whereas in 1996 he became a co-founder of the Federal Foundation for the Reconciliation of the SED Dictatorship.

In 2009 he was awarded Dialog Magazine Prize of the Polish-German Society and the 2010 European Solidarity Centre medal. Since July 2010 Wolfgang Templin has been the Director of the Warsaw office of the Heinrich Böll Foundation.
