= Ibrahim Böhme =

German politician (1944–1999)

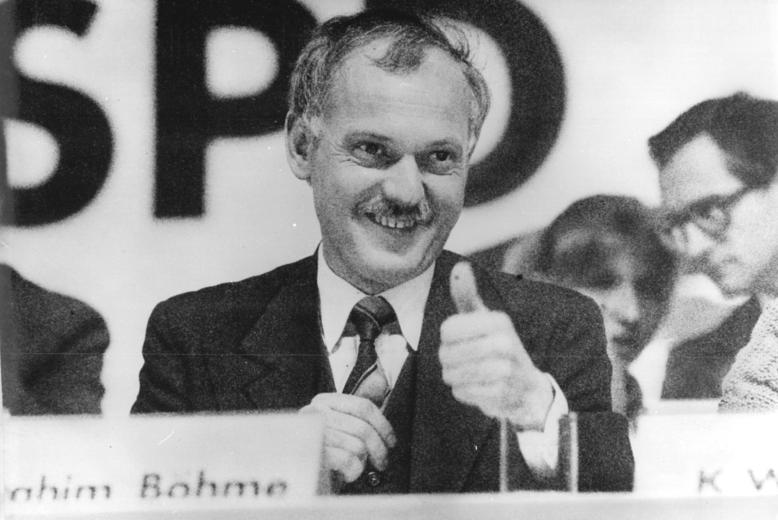
Böhme on 22 February 1990

Ibrahim Böhme (18 November 1944 in Bad Dürrenberg, Province of Saxony – 22 November 1999) was an East German politician and Stasi informer. Before becoming involved in politics, Böhme had numerous different jobs, including cook, waiter, bricklayer, teacher, and historian. In the late 1980s he was also a human rights advocate associated with the Initiative for Peace and Human Rights.

== Political career ==
He was a cofounder of the Social Democratic Party in the GDR in October 1989, and was elected as its first full-time chairman at the party's first regular congress in January 1990. He led the party to second place in East Germany's first and only free election, on 18 March 1990, and was slated to be a senior minister in the grand coalition led by Lothar de Maizière.

While coalition talks were underway, the weekly magazine Der Spiegel reported on 24 March 1990 that Böhme had been an informer for the Stasi since 1969. He had infiltrated opposition circles in East Berlin in 1985. Although Böhme denied this, he was forced to resign on 1 April. He was expelled from the Social Democratic Party in 1992 for "serious party-damaging behavior". Böhme was one of many East German citizens discovered to have been Stasi informants during the Communist era, sometimes ruining personal relationships as well as careers.

In 1992 a book about Böhme titled Comrade Judas: The Two Lives of Ibrahim Böhme, written by Birgit Lahann, was published in Germany.

Ibrahim Böhme died of heart complications in Neustrelitz on 22 November 1999 at the age of 55. He denied the accusations of him being a Stasi informer up to his death.
