= Gerd Poppe =

German politician (1941–2025)

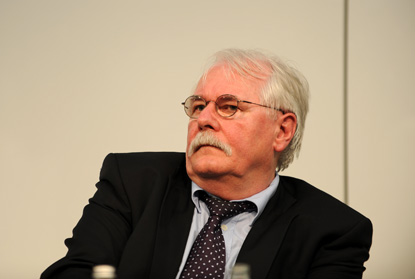
- Poppe in 2011

Member of the Bundestag
- In office 1990–1998

Personal details
- Born: 25 March 1941 Rostock, Mecklenburg, Germany
- Died: 29 March 2025 (aged 84) Berlin, Germany
- Party: Alliance 90/The Greens
- Spouse: Ulrike Poppe (m. 1979; div. 1997)

Gerd Poppe (25 March 1941 – 29 March 2025) was a German anti-communist activist and politician in the former German Democratic Republic (GDR). Poppe was born in Rostock. He was a member of the Modrow government and, following German reunification, sat in the Bundestag for Alliance 90/The Greens. Poppe served as Special Representative for Human Rights. From 1979 to 1997 he was married to Ulrike Poppe. He died on 29 March 2025, at the age of 84.
