= East German Round Table =

Series of meetings during the East German Peaceful Revolution

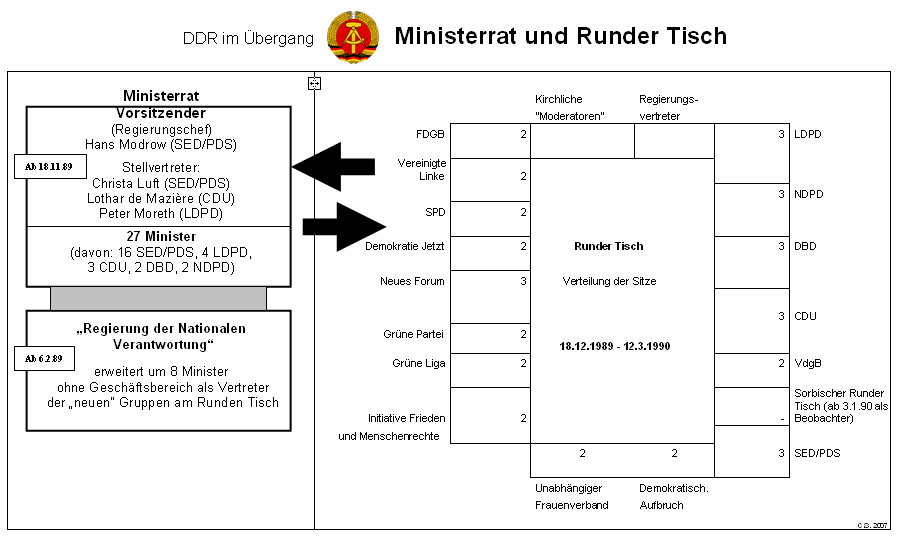
Composition of the Round table (right) and Council of Ministers (left)

The East German Round Table primarily refers to the Central Round Table (Zentraler Runder Tisch), a series of meetings held during the Peaceful Revolution in East Germany between late 1989 and early 1990. The first session convened in East Berlin on 7 December 1989, one day after Egon Krenz resigned as head of the Socialist Unity Party (SED) government. Initiated by the group Democracy Now and inspired by the Polish Round Table of April 1989, the Round Table was intended to bring together government-aligned bodies (such as the Blockpartei and the FDGB) and opposition groups (including Democracy Now, Democratic Awakening, and New Forum) on an equal footing. Unlike in Poland, the actual table used was rectangular; the name symbolised equal participation in shaping the future of the German Democratic Republic (GDR).

There were 39 participants at the Central Round Table, of whom 33 held voting rights. Seventeen of these represented opposition groups, while sixteen came from the SED-led National Front. Three additional representatives, speaking on behalf of women, consumers, and environmentalists, held observer status. The remaining three members were moderators from the Protestant, Catholic, and Methodist churches, who did not vote. Initially, many participants sought to reform the state while preserving its independence. However, public sentiment soon shifted towards reunification with West Germany, overtaking earlier reformist aspirations and ultimately rendering East German sovereignty untenable.

The first three meetings on 7, 18 and 22 December 1989 were held at the Protestant church’s Bonhoeffer House near Friedrichstraße in Berlin-Mitte. Due to increasing public interest and spatial constraints, later sessions from 27 December 1989 to 12 March 1990 took place at the SED-controlled Council of Ministers building on Ossietzky Street near Schönhausen Palace in Berlin-Pankow. Key outcomes included the decision to dissolve the "Office for National Security" (the renamed Stasi), the scheduling of free Volkskammer elections (originally set for 6 May but moved to 18 March 1990), and the drafting of a new constitution, completed by a subcommittee and presented on 4 April 1990, though never debated by the elected parliament. Local round tables, modelled on the central one, were also established throughout East Germany and remained active until new local governments were formed following the 6 May 1990 municipal elections.

== Bibliography ==
- Timothy Garton Ash, We the People: The Revolution of '89 Witnessed in Warsaw, Budapest, Berlin and Prague (London 1999)
- André Hahn, Der Runde Tisch: das Volk und die Macht – politische Kultur im letzten Jahr der DDR (Berlin 1998)
- Uwe Thaysen (ed.), Der Zentrale Runde Tisch der DDR: Wortprotokoll und Dokumente 4 vols. (Wiesbaden 2000)
- Uwe Thaysen, Der Runde Tisch. Oder: Wo blieb das Volk? (Opladen 1990)
