= Ludwig Mehlhorn =

German mathematician

Ludwig Mehlhorn (5 January 1950 in Bernsbach – 3 May 2011 in Berlin) was a German mathematician.
