= Alliance 90 =

1990–1993 East German political alliance

Alliance 90 Bündnis 90
- Logo
- Founded: 7 February 1990
- Dissolved: 14 May 1993
- Merger of: New Forum; Initiative for Peace and Human Rights; Democracy Now
- Merged into: Alliance 90/The Greens
- Ideology: Liberal democracy Anti-communism
- Political position: Center to center-left

Alliance 90 (German: Bündnis 90) was a political alliance of three non-communist political groups in East Germany. It was formed in February 1990 by the New Forum, Democracy Now and the Initiative for Peace and Human Rights. It received 2.9% of the vote in the 1990 Volkskammer elections. For the first all-German federal election it formed a joint list with the East German Green Party. It was this coalition that merged with the West German Green Party in 1993 to form Alliance 90/The Greens.

== History ==
On 7 February 1990, the New Forum, Democracy Now and the Initiative for Peace and Human Rights agreed upon the creation of the strategic partnership Alliance 90 ("Bündnis 90") for the 1990 East German general election. On 18 March 1990, in the next and final free election of the former East Germany, the Alliance 90 received 2.9% of the vote, thus securing 12 seats. By far the best result for Alliance 90 was in constituency of Berlin with 6.3%. In the remaining constituencies results ranged from 1.6% in Neubrandenburg to 3.8% in Potsdam. Together with the eight elected mandates from the "Green Party in the GDR", they created the "Alliance '90/Greens Party" Faction (Fraktion Bündnis 90/Grüne).

In the East German Landtag elections on 14 October 1990 the differently-composed electoral alliances made their entry into every Landtag except Mecklenburg-Vorpommern, where the New Forum did not participate in the alliance. In Brandenburg, the three civic groups of the Alliance 90 took office alone. In other states, the Greens also successfully took part in the electoral alliances. In Brandenburg from 1990 until 1994, Alliance 90 participated in a traffic light coalition with the Social Democrats and Free Democrats.

In the 1990 federal election held on 2 December 1990, the first election following the reunification of Germany, 6.1% of voters in the Eastern electoral area (1.2% across Germany) cast their Zweitstimme (the vote for a party, as opposed to for a person) for the group "Alliance 90/Greens – Citizens' Movement" (Bündnis 90/Grüne – BürgerInnenbewegung), which entered into the German Bundestag with eight East German elected members: Klaus-Dieter Feige, Ingrid Köppe, Gerd Poppe, Christina Schenk, Werner Schulz, Wolfgang Ullmann, Konrad Weiß and Vera Wollenberger. Werner Schultz took over the function of Speaker of the Bundestag group, which he held for the entirety of the legislative period. Its West German partners, the Greens, fell short of election to the parliament.

On 21 September 1991, the party Alliance 90 was founded, which brought together parts of the New Forum, Democracy Now and the Initiative for Peace and Human Rights. On 14 May 1993 came the agreement to create the union of Alliance 90/The Greens with the Greens which had been a cross-German party since the end of 1990.

One part of the Brandenburg state alliance advocated against a unification with the Greens, including future Minister-President of Brandenburg Matthias Platzeck, Günter Nooke, Ute Platzeck, Peter Schüler, Manfred Kruczek and Gerd Gebhardt. However, they were unsuccessful in their case and founded the Citizens' Alliance ("Bürger Bündnis"), headed by Günter Nooke, Matthias Platzeck und Wolfgang Pohl. The party Alliance 90/The Greens in Saxony had already been established on 27 September 1991, one and a half years before the unification at federal level.

== See also ==
- List of political parties in Germany

== Sources ==
- Brunzlow, Jan (8 May 2008). "Vision und Illusion vom mündigen Bürger". Potsdamer Neueste Nachrichten.
