= Bärbel Bohley =

German artist and politician (1945–2010)

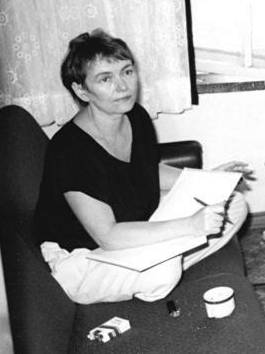
- Bohley in 1990
- Born: 24 May 1945; Berlin, Germany
- Died: 11 September 2010 (aged 65)
- Education: Weißensee Academy of Art Berlin (Dipl.)
- Occupations: Artist, human rights activist
- Years active: 1980 — 2010

Bärbel Bohley (24 May 1945 – 11 September 2010) was an East German opposition figure and artist.

== Biography ==
As an artist, Bohley won prizes from the authorities, including a trip to the Soviet Union. Her opposition to the government did not start until the 1980s. In 1983 she was expelled from the GDR artists federation (VBK) and was banned from travelling abroad or exhibiting her work in East Germany. She was accused of having contacts to the West German Green Party.

In 1985 she was one of the co-founders of the Initiative for Peace and Human Rights. In 1988 she was arrested during a demonstration and expelled from the DDR. She was given a six-month visa to the United Kingdom, and she returned to East Germany that August. In 1989 she was one of the founders of New Forum.

After the unification of Germany in 1990 she was involved in several court trials because she publicly proclaimed Gregor Gysi to have been a Stasi informer. Bohley spent several days in prison because she would neither publicly retract the statement nor pay a fine.

One of her later projects was a group help project near Sarajevo, where she put great effort into building homes in order to enable refugees to return after the armed conflicts in Bosnia-Herzegovina.

Bärbel Bohley died on 11 September 2010 of lung cancer.

== Selected works ==
- "'Es gibt keine wichtigen und unwichtigen Menschen in der Revolution' – 20 Jahre Mauerfall", in: Robertson-von Trotha, Caroline Y. (eds): Herausforderung Demokratie. Demokratisch, parlamentarisch, gut? (= Kulturwissenschaft interdisziplinär/Interdisciplinary Studies on Culture and Society, Vol. 6), Baden-Baden 2011

== See also ==
- List of German women artists
