= New Forum =

Political movement in East Germany

New Forum Neues Forum
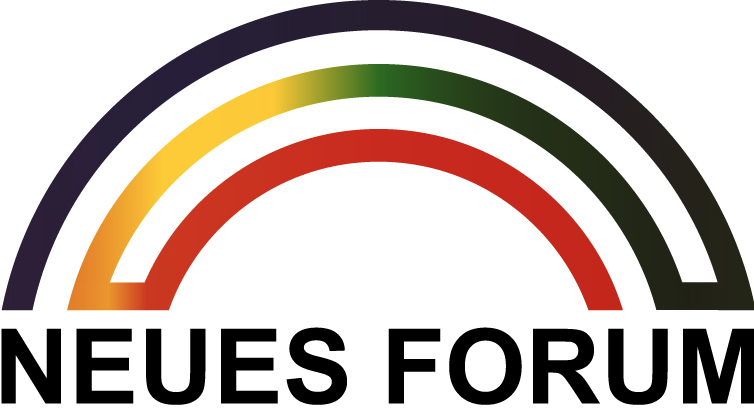
- Logo prior to 1990
- Founded: 9/10 September 1989
- Legalized: 8 November 1989
- Dissolved: 7 February 1990
- Merged into: Alliance 90
- Ideology: Liberal democracy

New Forum (German: Neues Forum) was a political movement in East Germany formed in the months leading up to the collapse of the East German state. It was founded on 9 September 1989 and was the first independent (non-National Front) political movement to be recognised by the Socialist Unity Party of Germany-led state on 8 November 1989. In February 1990 it formed Alliance 90 (Bündnis 90) with Democracy Now (Demokratie Jetzt) (DJ) and the Initiative for Peace and Human Rights (Initiative für Frieden und Menschenrechte) (IFM).

The New Forum was the first countrywide political movement in the GDR outside the Protestant church. Members of the Peace Movement, including Bärbel Bohley, Ingrid Köppe, Rolf Henrich, Jens Reich and Reinhard Meinel signed the "Aufbruch 89" [Initiative 89] founding proclamation on 9/10 September 1989 in Grünheide, which had been the last home of the dissident Robert Havemann. New Forum demanded a dialogue about democratic reforms, with the aim, together with the largest possible participation from the population, of 'reshaping' society.

== Timeline ==
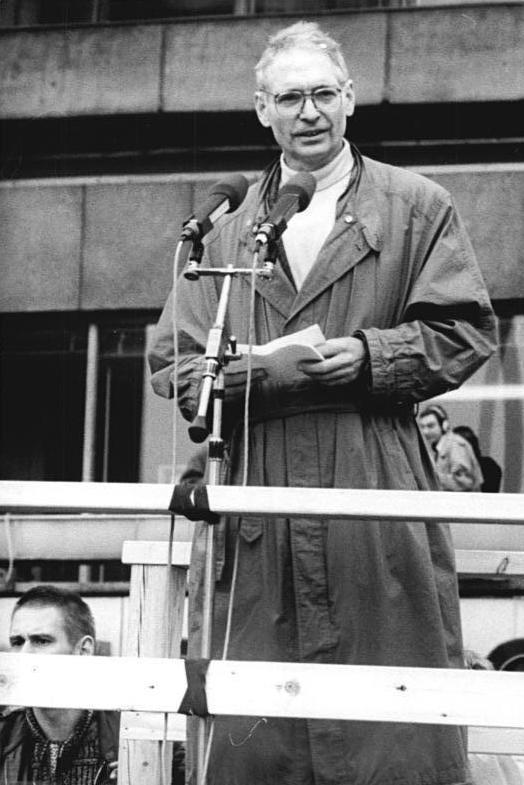
Jens Reich of New Forum speaking at the Alexanderplatz demonstration on 4 November 1989

- 19 September 1989 – Members apply for registration
- 21 September 1989 – Registration denied by the Interior Ministry: the New Forum is 'anti-state' and 'illegal'. Demonstrations follow. The increased pressure forces the authorities to allow New Forum to exist, and finally recognise it as a political organisation.
- By the end of 1989, 200,000 people have signed the proclamation, and there are approx. 10,000 full members. New Forum demands free and democratic elections. Local New Forum groups are active mostly in the cities. Discussions about the development of grass-roots democracy led by the end of 1989 to a dispute over whether New Forum should become a party or remain a movement.
- 27–28 January 1990 – About one quarter of the members (mostly from the southern regions of the GDR) split from New Forum and form the German Forum Party (DFP). New Forum retains its grass-roots democratic structure.
- February 1990 – New Forum joins with other opposition groups (Initiative Frieden und Menschenrechte (The Initiative for Peace and Human Rights] and Demokratie Jetzt [Democracy Now]) to form the political party Bündnis 90.
- May 1993 – Bündnis 90 and the West German Green party join to form Bündnis 90/Die Grünen.

== Notable former members ==
- Christoph Bergner, later joined CDU, Minister-President of Saxony-Anhalt 1993–94
- Bärbel Bohley
- Joachim Gauck, Federal Commissioner for the Stasi Archives 1990–2000, President of Germany 2012–2017
- Salomea Genin, German Jewish book author
- Rolf Henrich, writer and lawyer
- Stefan Heym
- Jan Josef Liefers
- Petra Lux
- Ulrich Mühe
- Heiner Müller
- Claudia Nolte, later joined CDU, Minister of Family, Seniors, Women and Youth Affairs 1994–98
- Jens Reich
- Werner Schulz, later joined Alliance '90/The Greens, Member of European Parliament 2009–2014
- Karin Ugowski
- Johanna Wanka, later joined CDU, Minister of Education and Research 2013–2018

== See also ==
- Category:New Forum politicians
