= Ulrike Poppe =

Member of the East German opposition (born 1953)

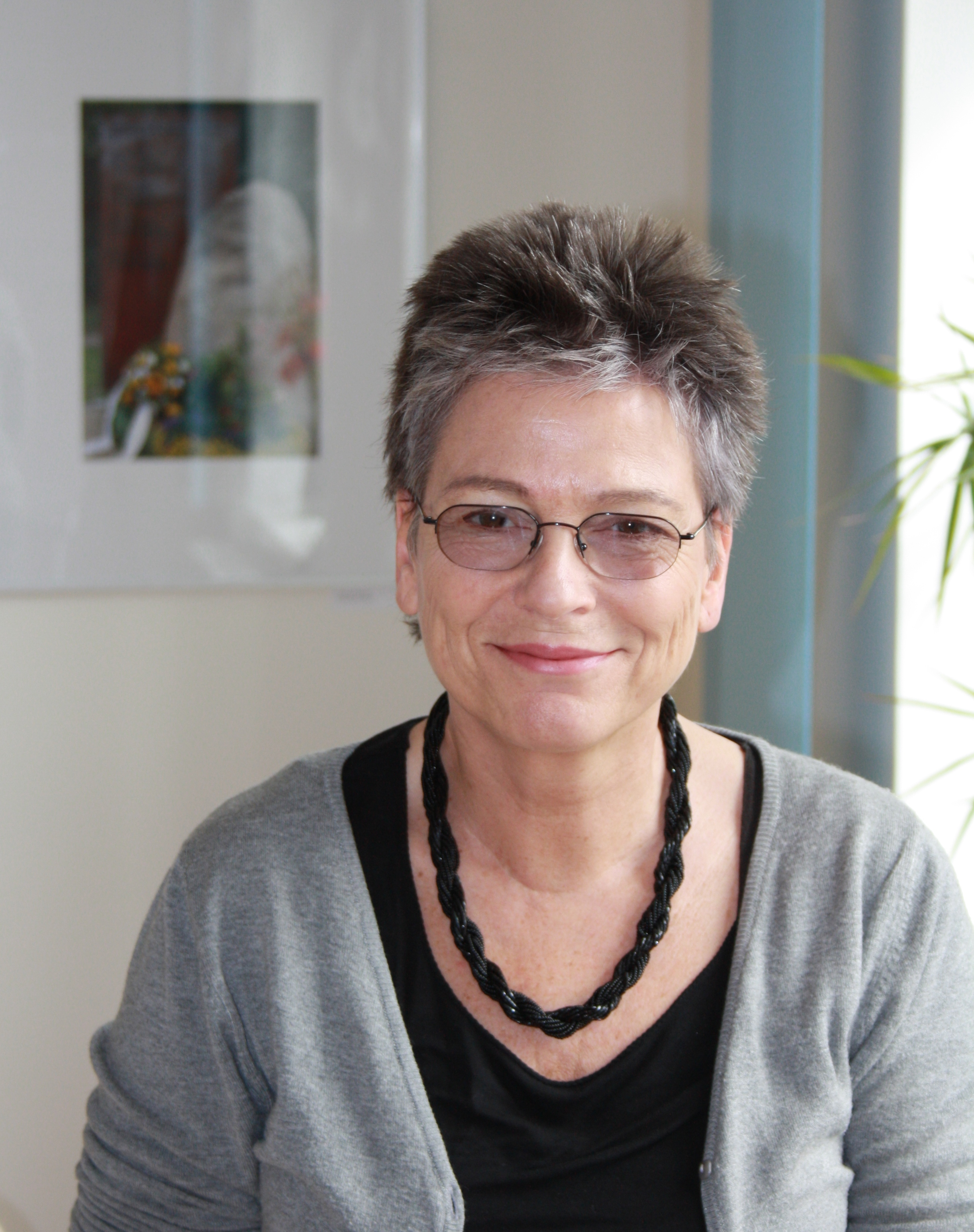
Poppe in 2012

Ulrike Poppe (née Wick; born 26 January 1953) is a German politician and activist, born in Rostock. She was a member of the East German opposition.

In 1982, she founded the "Women for Peace" network and in 1985 joined the Initiative for Peace and Human Rights. In 1989, she joined Democracy Now.

Poppe was a victim of the Stasi's Zersetzung psychological warfare program.

In 1995, she was awarded the Order of Merit and in 2000 the Gustav Heinemann Prize.

Since 2001, she was married to Claus Offe (1940–2025). She was previously married to Gerd Poppe from 1979 to 1997.
