= Dieter Popp =

German spy (1938–2020)

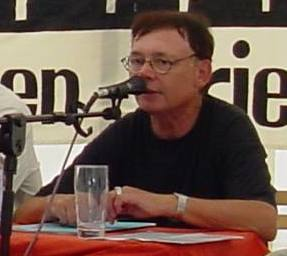
Popp in 2007

Dieter Popp (24 November 1938 – 27 November 2020) was a West German insurance agent who worked as a spy between 1969 and 1990. He was based in Bonn, at that time the so-called provisional capital of the German Federal Republic (West Germany). His espionage work was undertaken on behalf of the Military Intelligence Service of the East German National People's Army.

In 1990, during the run-up to reunification, Dieter Popp was arrested. In 1991 he was sentenced to a six-year prison term and heavily fined for what one source terms "aggravated espionage". Taking into account the time he spent held in pre-trial investigatory detention, he ended up serving four years of his six-year term. Released in 1994, he continued to believe passionately that East German intelligence operatives such as himself had been "missionaries of peace" ("Kundschafter des Friedens"). By keeping Soviet negotiators well briefed on the secret goals, methods, and red lines of their western counterparts in respect of Strategic Arms Limitation Talks he had contributed to the containment of east–west tensions and prevented the Cold War from exploding into a hot war as a result of western hubris and misplaced over-confidence. Over time it was the lessening of that east–west tension that opened the way to understandings between Mikhail Gorbachev and Helmut Kohl that put an end to the separate German Democratic Republic. In 1995 Dieter Popp co-founded and became the chair of an organisation of those whose beliefs in this respect were similar to his own, known as "Kundschafter des Friedens fordern Recht e.V." ("Missionaries of Peace demand Justice"). His powerful advocacy of his views continued to place him outside the German political mainstream.

== Life ==
=== Provenance and early years ===
Dieter Popp was born in Berlin. His father was a Communist (which had been illegal since 1933) and involved in resistance activity. His mother was a "non-Aryan". In 1939 his mother's grandfather, a member of a Jewish family and a leading surgeon in Chemnitz, was arrested in the operating theatre where he was working and deported to the Buchenwald concentration camp where he was subsequently murdered. The family were bombed out of their Berlin home in 1944 and evacuated roughly 100 km (62 miles) to the north, to Fürstenberg/Havel, formerly his father's hometown. Here they ended up living very close to the Ravensbrück concentration camp. He later recalled seeing the emaciated women inmates - mostly left-wing political prisoners - being marched through the town in rows of five. He would never forget the reactions of the gawping townsfolk: they saw these women, not without a certain warped sense of pride, as "their own prisoners".

=== Growing up in postwar Germany ===
War ended in May 1945 and his father was released from detention as an American prisoner of war in 1946. The family moved to Neustrelitz, a small town in the northern part of what was by now being administered as the Soviet occupation zone. The elder Popp helped set up the Neustrelitz branch of the Socialist Unity Party ("Sozialistische Einheitspartei Deutschlands" / SED), established under contentious circumstances in the Soviet zone in April 1946. During this period the family secretly gave sanctuary to an SPD activist who had been released from a concentration camp and now faced detention by the Soviet occupation authorities in the context of Stalin's purges against non-Communist activists. The matter did not end well. Both the SPD activist and Popp's father were arrested by the Soviet authorities. After his father had been released from jail, in 1950 the family moved again, this time back to what was becoming known as West Berlin, as the military division of the city was increasingly reflected by administrative, political and, later, physical divisions. By 1956 Dieter Popp's father had died. In West Germany and West Berlin the old Communist Party had not been subsumed into the SED, but it had become increasingly marginalised, seen both by the West German political establishment and the population more generally as nothing more than a proxy for the foreign policy of the Soviet Union. In August 1956 the Communist Party was banned by the West German Constitutional Court. Popp, by now aged 18, could not understand why "in the west the Communist Party was banned and Communists were again being persecuted".

=== Volunteer for espionage ===
Following a conventional schooling Dieter Popp took a job as an insurance agent. He was at the same time active on the left-wing intellectual scene in West Germany. During the mid-1960s he met the journalist Ulrike Meinhof, already becoming an iconic figure among those who believed that West Germany's pursuit of an American-style capitalist political-economic structure was a terrible mistake. In 1966 he offered his services to the East German military intelligence (die "Militärische Aufklärung der Nationalen Volksarmee"). Over the next few years he received from them payments totalling more than 110,000 Marks for his services.

=== The winning team ===
At the prompting of his handlers, in January 1969 Popp moved to Bonn, which at that time was the centre of the West German government. His target was the West German Defence Ministry. He cultivated the friendship of Egon Streffer, eight years his junior. Popp recruited Streffer on behalf of East German military intelligence. The use of so-called "Romeo-spies" - male intelligence officers who seduced female secretaries and other professionals for espionage purposes - was a common tactic of the East German spy chief, but successfully implemented cases involving a homosexual liaison, such as that of Popp and Streffer, were extremely rare. Popp and Schleffer were identified in intelligence sources by the cover names "Asriel" and "Aurikel". The two friends could barely believe their luck when Streffer, who had a background in business administration, found a job at the Ministry of Defence and was assigned in 1970 to the "planning staff", quickly becoming a respected civilian employee.

=== Modalities of espionage ===
Within a relatively short time of his arrival at the ministry, Egon Streffer had access to Defence Ministry documents covered by virtually the entire range of "secrecy classifications". One reason for Streffer's rapid promotion was that most of his colleagues had taken jobs in the ministry hoping that foreign travel would be a part of the job. There was minimal competition for a desk job as a low-profile clerk based permanently in sleepy Bonn. He worked alone in his office, located in an annex of the main staff office. In the judgement of one commentator, supervision of ministry staff was clearly very lax ("Die Kontrolle der Mitarbeiter war offensichtlich überaus lax"). Popp, meanwhile, retained his job as an insurance agent. The two men formed a highly efficient spy team. Popp handled liaison. He was in receipt of coded messages from handlers in East Berlin, using a specially configured Panasonic radio receiver housed in a small suitcase. The messages he received enabled him to identify and pre-select for Streffer the orders and special requests from the eastern security services.

Streffer was in charge of intelligence gathering. His administrative role in the operations room of the planning staff meant that his ministry work included the recording and copying of documents, as well as the disposal of those documents not needing to be retained. His access levels included documents that were "Highly secret" ("Streng geheim"), "NATO secret" and "US-top secret". Streffer simply took those documents of interest to intelligence chiefs in East Berlin, and during his lunch break, while colleagues were otherwise preoccupied, placed them casually on the backseat of his car, loosely contained inside copies of popular magazines such as Spiegel or Stern. (It was widely reported later that he had removed documents from his office "stuffed under his shirt", but Popp insisted that this was an incorrect detail added by prosecutors at his (Popp's)) trial in 1991. Streffer then drove home at the end of the day: his partner took the magazines and made copies of the documents hidden inside them the same day. The next day Streffer took the documents back to the office and returned them to the files in which they belonged or, where they were not to be retained, destroyed them.

Popp was described in a subsequent court report as Streffer's contact agent ("Führungsoffizier"). He was responsible for technical aspects and transport of the copied documents, using a Minox subminiature camera. Much of the documentation to be transported was time-sensitive and needed to be passed across quickly. A rendez-vous point for meeting up with a courier from East Berlin would be identified by radio. It might be in a restaurant, a department store, or some other suitable location. Popp and the courier would each arrive with identical bags or briefcases. One contained a secret compartment with copies of documents: the other did not. It did, however, contain up to 8,000 Marks. The cases were swapped and the courier would head for East Berlin with the case containing the copies. Popp would head home with an empty case.

Between 1970 and 1989 the documents obtained and returned by Streffer, copied by Popp, and communicated to East German intelligence included large amounts of material provided to their Defence Ministry by the planning staff of the West German military, providing detailed insights into evolving strategic concepts within NATO, along with plans for military maneuverings and operations. East German military intelligence were particularly interested in the detailed planning for the Wintex / Cimex military exercises which NATO conducted every two years from 1968 until 1989. Other documents covered matters such as new armaments projects, the development of new weapons systems and the overall short and long-term strategic planning by NATO.

Defence Ministry documents copied for the pair's East German spy-masters also included parliamentary processes and briefings regarding matters such as negotiating positions in arms reduction talks between East and West Germany, along with other highly confidential reports and papers concerning ministerial discussions. According to one evaluation, some ministry submissions to the West German Minister of Defence had already arrived in East Berlin before the minister in Bonn had received them from his own ministry team. The progress of documents from the Ministry officials to the Minister's desk sometimes took longer than the railway or road journey from Bonn to East Berlin.

=== Death of Egon Streffer ===
It was not the changes foreshadowing the end of the German Democratic Republic that put an end to this arrangement, but the death of Egon Streffer on 22 August 1989. Aged just 44 he suffered a fatal heart attack. There was no proof offered for the suggestions that his death had been AIDS related.

=== Arrest, trial, conviction, sentencing and imprisonment ===
Some months before reunification, and during the dissolution of the East German security services, Popp's activities were reported to the authorities by - according to Popp's own report of the matter - Eberhard Lehmann, a former Stasi informer. Popp was arrested on 14 May 1990 at his home by "three friendly young men" who turned up at 7 in the morning, and whom he initially mistook for news reporters. He was taken to Meckenheim near Bonn for an initial interrogation session and allowed to secure the services of a lawyer of his choice. He decided, early on, to say nothing. After a night in a cell on a concrete bed with a blanket, he came before Judge Detter of the Federal Court at Karlsruhe, and was committed to be held in pre-trial detention. He remained for a year and a half in investigatory detention, first in Koblenz and subsequently in Düsseldorf and Cologne.

Dieter Popp's trial took place in Düsseldorf over several days during the second half of December 1991. He was convicted on 23 December 1991 of espionage on behalf of the German Democratic Republic, which at the time of his criminal activities had been a foreign country widely seen as hostile to the German Federal Republic (West Germany), of which he had at the time been a citizen. He was sentenced to six years imprisonment (part of which had already been served through his pre-trial detention), and deprived of the right to hold public office or to vote in an election for a term of four years. He received what amounted to a fine set at 70,000 Marks and was required to contribute a further 20,000 Marks towards the cost of the legal proceedings.

According to Popp's own record, as he pronounced sentence the presiding judge also quietly wished the convict well and ordered the handing over of a small Christmas present in recognition of the imminent Christian "celebration of love" ("Fest der Liebe"): other sources make no mention of this detail. Following the sentencing, his experience of the prison system in North Rhine-Westphalia was further expanded by lengthy periods of incarceration at Hagen and Remscheid.

=== Release ===
Popp's appeal against the court verdict "on points of law" was rejected by a bench of five judges at the Federal Court of Justice on 22 July 1992. However, on 11 May 1994, with two thirds of his prison sentence served, he was released. Following his release he continued to pursue various avenues of appeal against the original verdict through the remoter reaches of the German legal system, but was unsuccessful.

After legal processes in Germany had been exhausted the matter was referred to the European Court of Human Rights on 2 November 1998. The application for the referral, which had been lodged on 1 May 1995, was a joint one. Popp's fellow applicant was Gabriele Gast, a former employee of the West German intelligence service ("Federal Intelligence Service" / "Bundesnachrichtendienst" / BND) who had been sentenced to a jail term because she was found to have spied on behalf of East German intelligence between 1973 and 1990. Like Popp, she lived in the Rhineland. She and Popp shared a passionate belief that after the collapse of East Germany they had been wrongly imprisoned by the German authorities for doing the right thing. They shared the same Munich-based lawyer. Beyond those details, their cases would appear to have had little in common. For both of their cases, however, the question which the court was called upon to determine concerned the actions of the German state. The court had to decide whether or not the German state had breached Article 6 § 1 of the European Convention on Human Rights, which covers the right of an individual to a fair trial. The court's decision, communicated on 25 February 2000, was that no such breach had taken place. An appeal to the Geneva-based United Nations Commission on Human Rights also failed.

=== Ex-prisoner with a mission ===
Between 1994, when he was released, and 2003, when he qualified for his retirement pension, Dieter Popp was registered as unemployed. He was far from inactive. In 1995 he founded the "Kundschafter des Friedens fordern Recht e.V." ("Missionaries of Peace demand Justice" / IKF). He has served as chair of the organisation since then. His deputy at the IKF is Gabriele Gast. The group, founded in 1995, comprises people who served the German Democratic Republic intelligence services before 1989, and who reject the idea that they have any reason to apologise for their contributions:

- "The task of the East German spies was the protection of our country and its allies. Our task was not to win a war but to help prevent any such war. ... After the defeat of Socialism in Europe we continue to strive for peace ... [Our theme] is war and peace and the role of the secret services. ... After the Cold War ended the "peace dividend" failed to materialise. More wars were waged and the idiocies of the arms race continued while the secret services apply surveillance methods which technically they continue to perfect. Hubristic capitalism turns out to be not merely the scourge of the third world, but is dividing rich from poor ever more starkly even in the societies of the rich countries. It may well be that this capitalism has itself already passed its peak."
- "Die Kundschafter der DDR hatten die Aufgabe, das Land und ihre Verbündeten zu schützen. Unsere Aufgabe war nicht, einen Krieg zu gewinnen, sondern jeglichen Krieg zu verhindern helfen. Als Gruppe "Kundschafter des Friedens" setzen wir uns auch nach der Niederlage des Sozialismus in Europa weiterhin für den Frieden ein. So sind auch die Themenbereiche unserer Homepage: Krieg und Frieden und die Rolle der Geheimdienste. In unserer kleinen Presseschau wählen wir Artikel zu diesen Themen aus, die uns lesenswert erscheinen und die wir meistens mit einem Kurzkommentar versehen. In regelmäßigen Abständen schreiben unsere Mitglieder oder befreundete Besucher eigene Redaktionsbeiträge zu aktuellen Anlässen. ... Nach dem Ende des Kalten Krieges hat es nicht die von manchen erwartete "Friedensdividende" gegeben. Kriege werden wieder geführt, der Rüstungsirrsinn geht weiter, die Geheimdienste arbeiten mit technisch immer perfekteren Überwachungsmethoden. Der übermütig gewordene Kapitalismus erweist sich nicht nur als Geißel der Dritten Welt; auch in den reichen Ländern spaltet sich die Gesellschaft immer mehr in Arm und Reich. Möglicherweise hat dieser Kapitalismus seinen Zenit aber bereits überschritten."

=== The Left ===
Popp was a member of Communist Platform, an association within "The Left" Party. The predecessor party of "The Left" party was the Party of Democratic Socialism (PDS) which traced its roots back to the old East German Socialist Unity Party. For September 2004 Dieter Popp was selected as a PDS candidate in Bonn for the local municipal elections. He was listed sixth on the party's candidate list, and in his election district he received 75 votes, equivalent to 1.7% of the district total.
