= William Borm =

German politician (1895–1987)

William Borm (7 July 1895 – 2 September 1987) was a German politician, of the Free Democratic Party (FDP). He was a member of the Bundestag from 1965 to 1972, and a member of the FDP National Executive Committee from 1960 to 1982. Several years after his death, it was revealed that since the late 1950s he had been an agent of the Stasi, the State Security Service of the German Democratic Republic.

== Life ==
Borm was born the son of a furniture merchant, and grew up with his uncle in Bautzen. He graduated from high school in 1914. In World War I he was from 1915 to 1918 a volunteer in a hussar regiment. He studied economics at the University of Berlin. In 1929 he founded a company for electro-acoustics. In World War II he was appointed in 1940 as a Wehrwirtschaftsführer. After 1945 he became chairman of the Industry Committee in the American sector of Berlin.

== Political career ==
From 1924 to 1933 Borm was a member of the German People's Party (DVP). In 1945 he joined the Liberal Democratic Party (LDP) and became Chairman of the Industry Committee. From 1948 to 1950 he was deputy LDP regional chairman. In 1950 he was arrested by the GDR's Volkspolizei at the Eisenach-Wartha border crossing on the transit highway and two years later sentenced to ten years imprisonment by the Greifswald Landgericht for incitement to war and boycott. He was detained in the prisons at Bützow-Dreibergen, Luckau and Cottbus. There in the late 1950s he undertook to cooperate with the East German Main Directorate for Reconnaissance, and was released early from prison on 28 August 1959.

From 1960 to 1969 he was state chairman of the Berlin FDP, and Honorary Chairman from 1972 to 1982. He was a Member of the FDP's Federal Executive Committee from 1960 to 1982, and from 1963 to 1967 a Member of the Berlin House of Representatives. From 1965 to 1972 he was member of the Bundestag. On 20 October 1969, as Alterspräsident (oldest member, or "honorary president"), he opened the first meeting of the sixth Bundestag. In 1967 he was co-founder of the Republican Clubs. After the breakup of the Social Democratic (SPD) - FDP coalition in 1982 he left the FDP and participated in the founding of the Liberal Democrats (LD). Soon after, he retired from active politics.

In 1970 Borm was awarded the German Great Cross of Merit and in 1975 this was upgraded to the Knight Commander's Cross. His further awards included the Ernst Reuter Medal of Berlin in silver in 1975, and the Carl-von-Ossietzky-Medal in 1982. In 1980 he was town elder of Berlin, and in September 1985 he received an honorary doctorate from the Karl Marx University of Leipzig.

=== Stasi agent ===
During all this time Borm maintained close contact with the Stasi, as an informal collaborator using the pseudonym "Olaf". He met regularly with the head of the Foreign Intelligence Markus Wolf and case officers in East Germany. According to Stasi Lieutenant Colonel Günter Bohnsack, the GDR's intelligence services wrote many of Borm's parliamentary speeches and articles in the 1960s. His speech as interim president of the German Bundestag on 20 October 1969 was edited by Wolf. After Stasi agent Johanna Olbrich alias Sonja Lüneburg already had been placed as a secretary at Borm's side in 1969, the Stasi foreign espionage ("Main Intelligence" - HV A) in 1978 installed the political scientist Jürgen-Bernd Runge as personal secretary in Borm's Bonn office. The participants knew nothing of each other's cooperation with the Stasi.

Politically Borm began to push for an agreement with the GDR, and in 1963 he published a controversial plan called "Germany". In 1966, he suggested negotiating with the GDR on the readmission of the KPD, in exchange for more freedom of movement for West Berliners. In 1979 he called for the recognition of GDR citizenship. In 1981 he became involved in public for the peace movement against the NATO Double-Track Decision, and on 10 October he spoke in front of 250,000 people in Bonner Hofgarten. In the same year he opposed foreign minister Hans-Dietrich Genscher, accusing him of working towards the final goal of German reunification, undermining the policy of European détente.

Publicly, Borm advocated political liberalism. However, in 1979, Borm explained in a secret conversation with the head of the Western Department of the Central Committee of the SED Herbert Häber that the idea of socialism was correct. Although the manifestation of socialism in the GDR was not yet sufficiently attractive, that should not be taken as criticism.

=== Personal life ===
Borm was married and has a son and a daughter. He was a member of the Berlin Masonic lodge Am Berge der Schönheit ("On mountains of beauty"). His gentlemanly appearance earned him the nickname "Sir William" from friends and from the head of the East German foreign espionage.

He died in Bonn on 2 September 1987, and received an honorary grave in the municipal cemetery in Zehlendorf, Berlin. After the revelation of his collaboration with the Stasi, the honorary grave status was abolished by a resolution of the Berlin Senate on 8 September 2009.

== Sources ==
- Hubertus Knabe: Die unterwanderte Republik. Ullstein Taschenbuch 36284, 2001. ISBN 3-548-36284-2
- Hubertus Knabe u.a.: West-Arbeit des MfS. Das Zusammenspiel von 'Aufklärung' und 'Abwehr'. Analysen u. Dokumente (Wiss. Reihe d. BStU), Bd. 18; Ch. Links Verlag, Berlin 1999. ISBN 3-86153-182-8
- Markus Wolf: Freunde sterben nicht. Das Neue Berlin 2002, ISBN 3-360-00983-5
- Klaus Marxen, Gerhard Werle (Hrsg.): Strafjustiz und DDR-Unrecht: Dokumentation. Spionage, Bd. 4., Walter de Gruyter, Berlin 2004, ISBN 3-89949-080-0
