= Ursula Richter (intelligence agent) =

East German intelligence agent

Ursula Richter was the name used by the spy Erika Reißmann (18 April 1933 - 2002) after she was infiltrated from East Germany into West Germany at the end of 1964. Between 1966 and 1985 she was employed in a series of jobs with businesses and agencies in the Bonn area which gave her access to information that was of interest to her handlers. Fearing imminent arrest in the west, she resurfaced in East Germany in August 1985. Her real employer during her two decades in West Germany was the Foreign Intelligence Service (" Hauptverwaltung Aufklärung" / HVA) branch of the East German Ministry for State Security ("Ministerium für Staatssicherheit"" / MfS / Stasi).

== Biography ==
=== The real Ursula Richter ===
She was born on 18 April 1933 in Wittenberg and worked as a domestic servant. Her parents had divorced soon after her birth and then both died in 1955. Neither had ever had the chance to get to know their daughter who had grown up, between 1934 and 1949, in a succession of care homes and orphanages. She then attended a "Housekeeping academy" and her work between 1950 and 1966 included several periods as a domestic servant in various private homes.

In April 1951 Richter was one of millions during the post war decade who fled across to West Germany, where she joined up with her sister. She lived first in Freiburg before moving, in 1952, to Switzerland, living successively in Bern and Zürich, working as a hairdresser and then in a hospital. Later she went to London where she worked as an "au pair". She nevertheless kept up her contacts in West Germany. She became pregnant by her boyfriend and in 1956 returned to East Germany where she married, becoming Ursula Saffran. The authorities determined that she no longer needed the name "Ursula Richter", which accordingly became available for reallocation by the security services.

Of particular importance in the selection of her identity for re-use by the intelligence services were the facts that before her marriage and resulting name change in 1956 she demonstrably had no living relatives in East Germany, and she had lived for several years in the west before returning.

=== The woman who used the name "Ursula Richter" for her work ===
==== Planning and preparation ====
After 1990 it became clear from papers in the Stasi archives that Erika Reißmann was listed by the Stasi office at Gera as an "informal collaborator" (informer) as early as 7 November 1961. She was identified at this time under the code name "IM-Kern". Notes on her file indicate that her handlers believed she was motivated not by money or hope of advancement, nor as the result of pressure applied by the Ministry, but by simple political conviction. At the Gera office she was handled by "Department 15" which was the regional branch of the HVA (espionage service). The Stasi selected Erika Reißmann for infiltration into West Germany because she was regarded as politically reliable, and she had almost no family ties in East Germany. Her parents and grandparents were dead, she had no contact with her brother: she was divorced and childless. In her early thirties, she was intelligent, committed, energetic, sociable and young, but "not too young".

Reißmann's infiltration into West Germany, which she later related, was characteristically well planned and prepared. She was taken to East Berlin and taught the necessary secret service tradecraft. Topics included photography and secret message writing, encrypting and decoding radio messages, using characters on a specific radio frequency and use of so-called dead letter drops for passing and receiving written messages. She learned to master the English language. The training also included several two week trips from East Berlin to West Germany during 1963 and 1964, using various false West German identities provided for the purpose. It was necessary to visit the places where Ursula Richter had lived and worked during her five years in the west in order to be able to incorporate knowledge of those places into the back story she would use after 1965 when living as Richter in the west. There were trips to Bern, Zürich and the London area for the same purpose. After that, in the late summer of 1964, Reißmann undertook a six-week visit to Toronto in Canada, now finally using a (false) passport in the name of Ursula Richter. Her brief involved gaining local knowledge, purchasing a driving license, and undertaking an investigation into a certain liquor factory and the private situation of its director. Having completed this exercise she returned to East Berlin for final preparations. All sorts of documents relating to the past life and employment history of Ursula Richter had to be created, along with a more recent certificate of employment, ostensibly provided by the director of a Toronto liquor factory.

==== Infiltration ====
At the beginning of December 1964 "Ursula Richter" relocated back to West Germany. Indications for the benefit of the West German authorities were that she had traveled directly from Toronto. In reality she crossed from East into West Berlin from where she continued by train to Bingen, some distance upriver from the West German capital. On 2 December 1964 she registered with the police at nearby Budenheim. She presented them with a passport which appeared to have been issued by the West German consulate in Toronto, explaining that she had been living and working in Toronto. The passport number was correct, but everything else about the document, which was a Stasi production, was false. The passport number related to a genuine passport issued to a German housewife by the Toronto consulate back 1963. Olga Jatz (born Olga Witt) had been born back in 1906. By the time the West German consulate in Toronto had issued her with a replacement in 1963, Mrs Jatz had already lived in Canada for more than ten years, so there would have been nothing remarkable about her having acquired the passport from a consulate overseas. With the support of the usual panoply of (forged) tax and insurance documents Ursula Richter's residency back in West Germany was completed and the first step in her infiltration had been successfully concluded. Her mandate now involved a two-year "legitimisation phase" during which she had very little contact with her HVA handlers. There were by now several million people living in West Germany who had previously lived in the Soviet occupation zone and then the so-called German Democratic Republic (East Germany) after its launch in October 1949. Ursula Richter was one of them.

Ursula Richter moved house several times during 1965. By the end of the year she was living in Bad Godesberg at an apartment in the Theodor Litt Street. (As Bonn expanded rapidly during the 1950s and 1960s, the formerly separate spa town of Bad Godesberg would be subsumed into it in 1969 for administrative purposes.) Between 15 June 1966 and 30 September 1972 she was employed in Bonn as a senior manager with the Catholic News Agency. The requirements of her Stasi handlers had been that she should try and get work with a news agency in the Bonn area, and they were initially content with the appointment.

==== Espionage ====
By 1966 she had also met Lorenz Betzing and recruited him for espionage work. Their professional partnership was subsequently complemented by a personal one. (In 1985 the New York Times described Richter as "Mr. Betzing's close friend".) In 1972 it seems that the Stasi had lost any interest they might once have had in the Catholic News Agency and Ursula Richter was prompted to find a new employer. In October 1972 she started a new job with the Bonn office of the "Association of the expelled" "Bund der Vertriebenen" (BdV). Frontier changes agreed in 1945 between the Soviets, the Americans and the British, and implemented during 1944/45, had left approximately the eastern third of what had been Germany shared out between Poland and the Soviet Union. It was far from the first time that Germany's eastern frontier had moved. What was unprecedented was the thoroughness of the ethnic cleansing which forced more than ten million Germans to move to the west of the "Oder–Neisse line". Many of these were still living in West Germany in 1972 and the BdV was a political lobbying organisation established in 1957 to promote their interests. Significantly, it was particularly "close to the Christian Democratic Party", which had led the West German government till 1969 and would do so again after 1982. She was employed as a clerk in the accounts office, but her handlers evidently anticipated that she would work her way up into a position of trust within the organisation and this she did, becoming a senior secretary and enjoying the confidence of the BdV leadership. Till 1972 "Agent IM-Kern"'s espionage activities had been handled from the Ministry's regional office in Gera which was where she had been recruited, but after 1972 she was handled by a division of the Ministry's national Intelligence headquarters (Hauptabteiling Aufklaerung, Abteilung II) in East Berlin. Intelligence services in East Berlin and partner agencies in Moscow were particularly interested in the BdV at this time. The organisation had broken with West Germany's ruling Social Democratic Party a couple of years earlier over Chancellor Brandt's newly flexible Eastern Policy (Ostpolitik) which led to a series of treaties in the early 1970s whereby the west recognised the frontiers imposed in 1945 and formally renounced any right of return to their former homes by the millions of Germans who had been ethnically cleansed a quarter century earlier. By sharing the documents that crossed her desk with her handlers "Ursula Richter" (as she boasted while facing criminal investigation after 1990) was able to give the East German authorities ringside access to the endless heated discussions taking place over the issues arising from inside the principal lobbying organisation involved, together with advance notice of its political plans and details over the identities of those funding it.

==== Back home to a grateful nation ====
On 18 August 1985, which was a Saturday, it was found that Ursula Richter had disappeared. The previous day she and her partner, Lorenz Betzing, crossed back to East Berlin. According to a newspaper report published at the time, she had been under surveillance from the western intelligence services since the start of the year, as they sought to identify her contacts and the extent of any spy network with which she was involved. Other sources contend that West German intelligence became aware that Ursula Richter and Lorenz Betzing were spying for East Germany from Horst and Gelinde Gerau in the middle of April 1985, and that prior to that date Richter and Betzing were under no suspicion. The Garaus knew that Richter and Betzing were involved in spying for East Germany because they had met up at the start of 1985 for a "training session" at which Ursula Richter appears to have been in charge. The Garaus may (or may not) have been double agents. Sources differ: Horst Garau's death in 1988 in an East German prison - which may or may not have been a suicide - left a number of questions unanswered. But the information about Richter's espionage appears to have passed via Hans-Joachim Tiedge who almost certainly was, at different times, providing information to intelligence services in both East and West Germany. The indication that Richter's activities were disclosed to the western intelligence services via the Garaus appears to originate from research in subsequently discovered interrogation notes concerning other East German informants. At least one source links Richter's fear of imminent arrest to the defection, publicised the previous month, of Oleg Gordievsky, a senior and exceptionally well-informed Soviet KGB colonel who had apparently, as matters turned out, been passing sensitive intelligence to the west since 1974. The new-found belief that Gordievsky had been leaking the identities of eastern spies to the west triggered a "wave of paranoia" in the intelligence services of the Soviet Union and her allies, partly because it was not at all clear whose cover might have been blown. In any event, Richter and Betzing were just two of a larger number of East German spies in West Germany who suddenly disappeared during August 1985. Johanna Olbrich (alias 'Sonja Lüneburg') had returned to East Berlin on 3 August 1985. Tiedge himself crossed back into East Berlin on 19 August 1985.

On 24 October 1986 an investigating judge from the Federal Court in Karlsruhe issued a warrant for the arrest of Ursula Richter: "She is strongly suspected of having undertaken secret service actions in Bonn against the Federal Republic of Germany on behalf of the intelligence services of a foreign power between December 1964 and 17 October 1985." The Public Prosecutor launched an investigation. Across the internal border Ursula Richter had reverted to her former name and was living as Erika Reißmann in the Köpenick quarter of East Berlin. Supported by a monthly disability pension of 2718 Marks, she had not returned to work. As late as October 1989, while the infrastructure of the East German surveillance state crumbled, her pension application was supported by a statement from the deputy Minister for State Security: "Comrade Erika Reißmann was sent across to the Federal Republic in 1964 as a scout (Kundschaferin). In various jobs in Bonn she worked on a huge amount of information and a very large number of documents, giving our party and government leadership a[n otherwise] virtually closed overview of revanchist organisations in West Germany and of their planned operations against East Germany".

==== Reunification ====
The reunification process came into effect, formally for most purposes, in October 1990. The Federal Court resumed its investigations. Reißmann was willing to testify about her activities as an intelligence agent, disclosing most of what she knew, and on 12 November 1990 the prosecuting authorities withdrew the arrest warrant against her. After two and a half years of further investigation and testimonies from those involved, the case against her was dropped on 12 March 1993. The public Public Prosecutor issued a statement to the effect that pursuing the matter further would not be in the public interest. Reißmann had indeed passed a large amount of material to the East German Ministry for State Security during the years up to 1980. However, after she underwent a leg amputation in that year her espionage activity had been greatly diminished and it seemed that the East Germans had treated her as a "social case". As an unconvicted suspect she had been living, since 1989, on a monthly income of just 990 Marks. At the time of her disappearance in 1985 she had built up a balance of 72,000 Marks in her account with the Bonn "Sparkasse" (literally: "savings bank"), which was presumed to represent payment for her espionage activity. This had been forfeited to the West German government. The defendant was required to contribute 67,138 Marks to the accumulated costs of her own trial, which the court agreed could be paid back in monthly installments of Marks. After 1999 the outstanding balance was written off.

Erika Reißmann died at Köpenick in 2002. Some of the details of her life have emerged only after her death, as a result of continuing research in the Stasi archives.
