= Ursula Richter =

Ursula Richter may refer to:

- Ursula Richter (intelligence agent) (1933–2002), infiltrated from East Germany into West Germany at the end of 1964
- Ursula Richter (photographer) (1886–1946), German photographer
