= Johanna Olbrich =

East German spy (1926–2004)

Johanna Olbrich (alias 'Sonja Lüneburg': 26 October 1926 – 18 February 2004) was an East German spy. Infiltrated into West Germany from Colmar (France) in 1966 or 1967, she moved to Bonn in 1969 and obtained work as a secretary with a senior politician.

Her espionage career ended abruptly in 1985 when she lost her (false) passport during a vacation in Rome. Fearing that the passport had fallen, or could fall, into the hands of western counter-intelligence services, which would lead to her unmasking, her handlers hurriedly ordered her back: she was smuggled into East Germany near Lübeck within the week.

== Life ==
=== Provenance and early years ===
Johanna Olbrich was born in Lauban, a small manufacturing town in Silesia and to the west of Breslau (as Wrocław was known at that time). Her father was a railway worker. She was six when the Nazi Party took power and nineteen when the war ended and she watched a "death march" of surviving former inmates from the Auschwitz concentration camp being forcibly moved towards the west in order that they should not be found still inside the concentration camps by the Soviet forces invading from the east.

=== Teaching career ===
Between 1942 and 1945 she attended teacher training colleges in Lauban, Neustadt (Neisse) and then Löbau, which was a short distance away but, critically, on the western bank of the Neisse River. During 1944/45 Silesia had been the scene of extensive ethnic cleansing and frontier changes implemented in April/May 1945 meant that the entire region was now part of Poland. A large chunk of what had been central Germany was now administered as the Soviet occupation zone and it was here that Johanna Olbrich, despite not having completed her training, embarked on a career as a teacher and, later, as a school head. Between 1950 and 1960 she undertook, and apparently completed, the rest of her teacher training by correspondence course with the party's "Karl Marx" Academy in Potsdam. She had already, in 1946, joined the Socialist Unity Party ("Sozialistische Einheitspartei Deutschlands" / SED), created in April of that year and by October 1949, when the Soviet occupation zone was rebranded and relaunched as the Soviet sponsored German Democratic Republic (East Germany), well on the way to becoming the ruling party in a new kind of one-party dictatorship.

=== Espionage ===
In 1960 she took a job in the Ministry for popular training and education where Margot Honecker was already installed as a "deputy minister" and exercising her powerful influence. The way now lay open to an academic career, but Johanna Olbrich made other choices. One of her colleagues was in the habit of making his apartment available as a "conspirative apartment" (konspirative Wohnung) to the Ministry for State Security ("Stasi"), where a local Stasi officer might conduct discreet meetings with informers. The colleague was getting married, however, and wished to end the arrangement in case it might interfere with married life. He suggested that Johanna Olbrich might wish to make her apartment available for the discreet meetings in place of his. She was known to be a committed government supporter and, as expected, agreed. The next event of significance occurred when the Stasi officer, before leaving the apartment at the end of one of his meetings, stopped to ask Olbrich directly if she would be prepared to move across to the west and obtain information for the East German authorities. The offer reflected her unquestioning support for the regime, and after a few days of consideration she agreed unconditionally to serve her country as requested. There followed a further period of preparation during which her suitability for an espionage mission was more systematically assessed. It was also necessary to arrange an alternative identity.

Sonja Lüneburg (born Sonja Lydia Goesch: 1924–1996) was a Berlin hairdresser. In 1950 she crossed from the eastern (Soviet administered) half of Berlin to the western sector. Thousands were doing the same at this time, and there were not yet any significant physical barriers preventing migration from east to west. Motives are generally believed to have been economic, but sources indicate that Sonja Lüneburg moved to the west for love. Sixteen years later, her relationship in the west having broken apart, she made the mistake of returning to her former home in East Berlin. She submitted her passport for inspection at the Weissensee frontier crossing. It was retained. Evidently her age and other attributes corresponded to the profile the Ministry for Security officials had been looking out for. The committed East German socialist Johanna Olbrich had already become a "peace activist", having joined the Stasi Intelligence Service (Hauptverwaltung Aufklärung, /HVA) in 1962 or 1963, and is identified in Stasi files from between 1962 and 1988 under the code name "Anna". For her mission to the west, however, she needed a complete identity. Sonja Lüneburg's identity was available. Olbrich learned the necessary details of her new identity in preparation for her move to the west. While all this was going on the real Sonja Lüneburg applied for permission to leave the country permanently, but the authorities had by now become acutely aware of a shortage of working age population, resulting both from the slaughter of war and from the exodus during the 1950s of several million East Germans wishing to become West Germans. Flight from the (East German) republic was by this time not permitted, and Lüneburg's request was declined. Instead, the Ministry for State Security had her held in a detention centre for nearly a year and then placed in a psychiatric institution where she was treated with a series of injections, tablets and electric shocks. She was wrecked. The doctors diagnosed paranoid schizophrenia. She was finally released in November 1974, but readmitted to an institution less than a year later. In 1983 she was transferred to a retirement home where according to reports she took to identifying herself as "Empress Sonja". In 1993, it was reported that the real Sonja Lüneburg was still alive, still institutionalised, but living by now in a retirement home in Berlin (Wilhelm-Kuhr-Straße), finding her only comfort in the "Cabinet" cigarettes which she chain smoked. The real Sonja Lüneburg died in 1996. The woman who stole her identity seems never to have shown any very deep concern over what happened to the real Sonja Lüneburg.

In 1967 (the false) Sonja Lüneburg was taken to West Germany, using an indirect route via Colmar in Alsace. For the next two years she lived in Hamburg where she had obtained work with an insurance company. Outside office hours she was undergoing intense further training. She undertook several overseas foreign trips to London, Sweden and France, enabling her to gain a detailed knowledge of how frontier formalities worked. She was still in Hamburg in 1969 when, on the urgent recommendation of her Stasi handler, she replied to a newspaper job advertisement for a secretarial job in Bonn - then the West German capital. Her application was successful, and she found herself working, between 1969 and 1972, as secretary for William Borm, a FDP member of the West German parliament ("Bundestag"). An irony of which neither of them was aware at the time was that Borm was also on the Stasi payroll.

Sources are in some respects imprecise as to how Olbrich was able to pass information to the East German authorities from her secretarial work, but she presumably used the miniature (by the standards of the times) camera with which she had been issued to photograph documents that passed across her desk. After German reunification, which took place in 1990, Stasi records were made accessible to scholars. One of these, Helmut Müller-Enbergs, calculated that between December 1970 and July 1985, 492 items were passed to the Stasi from Agent "Anna" of which 394 were identified as documents. Most were "position papers" and minutes of meetings between members of the FDP party leadership. Many had been annotated "very good" and 29 contained information that it had been thought appropriate to pass to the leadership of East Germany's ruling SED party.

As William Borm approached retirement age his work load declined, but he was able to recommend his efficient secretary to colleagues. In 1972 she transferred to the party general secretary, Karl-Hermann Flach. However, Flach suffered a stroke and died at the unexpectedly young age of 44. His successor as party general secretary was Martin Bangemann who inherited not merely the job but also his predecessor's secretary, known in the west as Sonja Lüneburg. Bangemann was also, between 1973 and 1984, a member of the European Parliament. Olbrich, urged on by her East German handlers, convinced him that she could work as his secretary both on Bonn and in Brussels. In the words of her ultimate boss, East Germany's legendary spy chief Markus Wolf (who in their retirements became a neighbour), "for Johanna there were now many pressures.... Each day she commuted hither and yonder between offices and apartments in the federal capital and in Brussels, striving not to neglect the interests either of her [western] boss nor of ours [as her spymasters]". Beyond her allotted tasks she was taking time carefully to make notes of important meetings, photocopying critical documents. She would photograph even her own handwritten notes of meetings in order to make them small enough to be more easily transported. For years, each month she would pack two or three photographic film rolls each of 36 images in a little envelope which she then left in the toilet of a train travelling to the east. This meant that sometimes when she travelled by train she took a slightly indirect route in order to be on the correct express train from West Germany's busiest Railway station at Cologne to East Berlin.

In 1984, after an election which had led the FDP to "change sides" and join the governing coalition, Martin Bangemann became West Germany's Minister for Economics. His secretary occupied the office directly outside the minister's own, and the usefulness to her handlers of the documents crossing her desk increased further. The relationship between the minister and the spy became close. There are pictures of Olbrich accompanying the Bangemann family on Mediterranean sailing holidays.

The Bonn espionage career ended abruptly in July 1985. Returning from a visit East Germany via an indirect route, in an uncharacteristic moment of carelessness she left her travel bag in a Rome taxi. Along with her clothes, the bag contained an implausibly large amount of cash - 5,000 West German Marks - and a forged passport containing her photograph. Probably, as she ruefully related later, the taxi driver would be interested only in the cash. But she could not be sure. After a brief period of reflection in East Berlin the decision was taken by Markus Wolf himself that she should return to East Germany, which she did on 3 August 1985. In Lübeck she met a "smuggler" employed by the Stasi, who as she later wrote, was more normally involved in helping East Germans escape to the west. He took her by boat to a point in the (normally deadly) frontier defences between East and West Germany. East German border officials were waiting for them. She was escorted safely across the wide strip of open land on the East German side of the Inner German border. She was welcomed beyond the militarised strip with a glass of brandy.

Following her disappearance from her apartment in Bonn it was searched. Colleagues and contacts were interviewed. From the western perspective (the false) Sonja Lüneburg was recorded as "missing" until 1991. Johanna Olbrich's own memoir was finally published ten years after her death in 2013, which has encouraged the appearance of several thoughtful contributions on her years as a spy. Sources nevertheless remain very largely silent over what happened to her between her sudden return to East Germany in 1985 and German reunification in 1990. It is recorded that she was showered with awards and medals, along with a cash reward for her years of faithful and, it would appear, productive espionage.

=== The retired spy ===
By the time of the changes of 1989/90 Johanna Olbrich was living in an apartment block in Bernau, just outside Berlin. After reunification it was a former colleague from the Stasi Intelligence Service (Hauptverwaltung Aufklärung, /HVA) who denounced her. She was arrested on 11 June 1991 and spent two months held in investigatory detention, before being released on bail. When she faced the regional high court in Düsseldorf she took the opportunity to share her belief that she "had done something that was right and important". She had wanted to "secure the peace in Europe". Writing later of the uncomprehending reaction by the prosecuting team at her Düsseldorf trial, she would observe "they simply could not grasp my motives, because they were prisoners of their own prejudices". In 1992 she was sentenced to a thirty-month jail term. However, she was released in 1994 and returned to her home in Bernau.

One reason that Johanna Olbrich's story is relatively widely known is that she featured prominently in a 2003 memoir published by the retired former spy chief Markus Wolf. In retirement the two became friends. Commentators observed that when Wolf took trips out of town it was Johanna Olbrich who was called upon to look after his domestic cats.

She also remained on friendly terms with Martin Bangemann, probably the most high-profile target of her successful career in espionage. Even at her trial, in 1992, he came to see her and greeted her with a hand shake in the court room. At Christmas in 1999 he sent her a copy of a political book with a note: "Dear Sonja - Your part in the story is only briefly set out. Happy Christmas, Health and Fortune, also for 2000. Warm greetings".

Johanna Olbrich died on 18 February 2004 at Bernau bei Berlin.
