= Gabriele Gast =

German intelligence officer

- Born: 2 March 1943 (age 83); Remscheid, Rhine Province, Germany
- Education: RWTH Aachen University
- Occupations: Political analyst Spy
- Political party: CDU; SED

Gabriele Gast (born 2 March 1943) is a former double agent and East German spy. In 1973, Gast responded to a newspaper job advertisement purportedly placed by the Ministry for Foreign Affairs. On 1 November 1973, she started to work with the West German intelligence service (the Bundesnachrichtendienst/BND).

Background vetting undertaken by the BND had failed to identify that since 1968 Gast had been on the books of the East German HVA, the branch of the East German Ministry for State Security (Stasi) concerned with "foreign" intelligence. For an unknown reason, it was not till 1990, when she was "betrayed by a defector", that the West German Intelligence Service became aware of her espionage activities.

Informants who passed information from the West to the East German intelligence services were often paid a fee. Gabriele Gast refused to accept payment and reportedly engaged in espionage for "love". It is theorised that after some time the "love" was matched and replaced as the driving force for her espionage work by a deep political commitment. Despite her changing circumstances, she never accepted payment from her East German spy chiefs. After the Cold War had ended with the fall of the USSR, and after she had served her sentence in West Germany, she presented herself as a spy "from conviction" ("aus Überzeugung").

A recent article from Sven Felix Kellerhoff ranked Gast as East Germany's fourth most damaging spy, one place ahead of Günter Guillaume.

== Life ==
=== Early years ===
Gast was born in Remscheid during the Second World War, approximately three months before most of the town was destroyed in a firestorm caused by aerial bombing. Her father, who died while she was very young, was a driving instructor. The youngest of three siblings, she grew up in a conservative Catholic household in what became, in May 1949, the German Federal Republic (West Germany). Intelligent and diligent in her studies, she became politically engaged and inherited her parents' political conservatism, joining the Association of Christian Democratic (i.e. conservative) Students ("Ring Christlich-Demokratischer Studenten" / RCDS) and the mainstream centre-right CDU (party). Like many people in western (and central) Europe, she was, according to her later testimony, opposed to the Soviet invasion of Czechoslovakia in August 1968. By that year she was working on a doctorate in political sciences, supervised by Klaus Mehnert at the university in Aachen. Her chosen topic focused on the role of women in the German Democratic Republic. Her dissertation was submitted and her doctorate was received in 1972.

=== Espionage ===
In the summer of 1968, Gabriele Gast visited Plauen, in the extreme south of what was then the German Democratic Republic, to undertake research for her doctorate on "the political role of women in the German Democratic Republic". The necessary permissions had been obtained by cousins in Plauen whom she had contacted in order to organise the trip. By this time she had already been a card-carrying CDU member for three years, but it is nevertheless apparent that the local Stasi office had also been undertaking preparations of their own in anticipation of her visit. Sources are inconsistent regarding the sequence of events as to how and when Gast met Karl-Heinz Schneider, the man she came to know as Karl-Heinz Schmidt. She appears to have met him first in Karl-Marx-Stadt (as Chemnitz was known at this time), where she had travelled to interview members of the Democratic Women's League of Germany ("Demokratischer Frauenbund Deutschlands" / DFD). It would have been remarkable for her to have travelled unescorted under these circumstances, and she was indeed accompanied to Karl-Marx-Stadt by an MfS "minder" who introduced her to "Karl-Heinz Schmidt", who was also visiting the city. It turned out that he knew her MfS escort and, on learning that the man was planning to drive to nearby Dresden, asked if he could cadge a lift. Gast, as she testified many years later, had been planning to stay in Karl-Marx-Stadt that afternoon, presumably to write up notes of her meetings with the DFD ladies, but on learning that there was an afternoon trip to Dresden in the offing, she asked if she might come along. That evening, to thank him for including her in his little expedition, she bought Karl-Heinz a glass of wine at the "Kosmos Bar". "Karliszek", as he invited her to call him, was a good-looking fair-haired man of considerable charm, eight years her senior. He said he was a car mechanic. She liked him, although after sharing a glass of wine, it seems they went to their separate hotel rooms. Soon, she became aware that they had fallen in love.

Sources are silent over the extent of "Karliszek's" skills as a car mechanic. He was "tactful, charming, a good dancer, and jovial". He was a highly trained MfS agent: his task was to seduce women who might be persuaded to work for his employers. Karliszek's long-running relationship with Gabriele Gast would become – at least until 1990 – a textbook case of how these exercises could play out when everything went well, from the perspective of the spymasters.

Encouraged by her supervisor, Mehnert, Gast decided it would be helpful to return to Karl-Marx-Stadt a few months later to broaden the range of her contacts with politically active women. She conducted more interviews, visited libraries, and undertook further research in the region. She also met up again with "Karliszek". Realising that they needed to spend more time together, he suggested that they meet in the future in East Berlin, which she could visit on the train from the West using a simple "day visa". That idea connected well with Gast's study plans, which included visits to archive repositories in West Berlin. However, she could not undertake unlimited ad hoc visits across to East Berlin simply on the pretext of undertaking research or visiting relatives. Schmidt's reaction was both sympathetic and practical: he had a friend who might be able to help.

"Karl-Heinz Schmidt's" friend was introduced to her as "Gotthard Schiefer". In actuality, he was Gotthard Schramm, a department head with the Ministry for State Security in the Karl-Marx-Stadt region. The names by which they identified themselves to Gabriele Gast were false. In other respects, the two men were shockingly honest at a meeting held between the three of them at the "Hotel Unter den Linden" in East Berlin. "Karl-Heinz Schmidt" was not a car mechanic with abundant free time: they told her they both worked for the East German security services (Stasi) and that their bosses believed that Gabriele Gast had been sent by the West German intelligence services to report back on her friend, "Karl-Heinz Schmidt". The series of unexpected disclosures badly shook her, but she knew she loved "Schmidt". While she was taking it all in, "Schiefer" added that the Stasi suspicions might be tempered if she were able to display an "open-minded willingness to assist them" ("eine aufgeschlossene Bereitschaft zur Mithilfe gegenüber dem MfS"). It did not seem so terrible to her: "help us out, and you can go on seeing each other". What was involved seemed to be not treachery but a little cooperation, since as she was just a student she had no critical information to share. "Schiefer" asked for a few names of students who might be helpful or snippets of casual gossip on the professors back at the university in Aachen, and if she know anyone serving in the West German army.

After agreeing to help, Gast soon found herself sent on an intensive spycraft course, including hands-on training with the latest in covert communications equipment. She was given a Stasi code name, "Gisela", which came with a false passport and a new handbag, incorporating a well concealed secret compartment. Back home in Aachen, every Tuesday evening at the same time she tuned into a shortwave radio station from East Germany and carefully wrote down a long line of numbers, read out in a monotone, without further elaboration, by a "radio presenter". When she decrypted the messages from Schmidt she found some were instructions while others were simply encouraging love messages. An arrangement was set in place whereby she should visit East Berlin every three months. A more specific early assignment involved contacting a fellow student and getting him to meet up with a Stasi agent masquerading as a financial consultant. There is speculation that this seemingly inconsequential challenge was an early "test" which she passed.

In 1970, Gast and "Schmidt" became engaged. They celebrated in a Stasi hostelry. None of their parents knew. The only friend who participated in the celebration was "Gotthard Schiefer" (Gotthard Schramm). There was also a taped message of goodwill from the men's head of department in Karl-Marx-Stadt, Colonel Egon Lorenz. After her unmasking in 1990, Gast encountered evident incredulity from an investigating judge that she and her fiancé had never married, and asked why she had not obtained work in East Germany, married and had children with her man. Her emotionally charged reaction in court suggested that Gast would have loved to have done just that. Though Gast likely would not have experienced difficulty in obtaining work in East Germany, something always prevented a marriage from taking place. It could and was argued that Gast's own actions contributed to the indefinite deferral. After earning her doctorate, which marked the end of her time as a student, it was she who took a research job in Munich with the Forschungsinstitut für Sicherheit und internationale Zusammenarbeit e.V. ("Research Institute for Security and International Collaboration"), a right-wing political pressure group. It was a reasonable career move for an intellectual CDU member with a newly earned doctorate in political sciences, but it was not an obvious route to a life as an East German housewife. At the Research Institute, she solemnly photographed anything that could possibly be of interest to her HVA (ie Stasi) handlers, who organised the necessary "courier" arrangements. By the end of 1973 she had allowed herself to be headhunted for work in the West German intelligence service ("Federal Intelligence Service" / "Bundesnachrichtendienst" / BND), located at Pullach (still in the Munich area).

Upon joining the BND she was given an additional cover name to remember: for the BND she was Dr. Gabriele Leinfelder. Within a year she was assigned to the intelligence analysis section that dealt with the Soviet Union. She achieved steady promotion through surveying and analysing all the information that arrived in the department concerning Eastern Europe on behalf of her employers in both western and eastern intelligence.

As the decade wore on the relationship with "Karl-Heinz Schmidt" became a little less intense, but several sources insist that they remained close as friends and colleagues. Regular meetings continued, combining the personal and professional needs and requirements of the lovers. There were weekend breaks together in Austria or northern Italy, away from the surveillance of West German intelligence and beyond the comfortable surveillance range of Gast's HVA controllers in East Berlin, so they could dine in intimate restaurants and attend the opera in Vienna just like any other couple. Meanwhile, a dedicated communications channel was set up. Every few weeks Gast coincided casually with her contact, usually in a public restroom/toilet, and they swapped identically hollowed deodorant spray canisters. The one destined for the east was filled with reels of microfilmed documents from the desks of the West German intelligence operatives. The contact then took a train journey towards Berlin, but before she left the train she would conceal the canister behind a wall panel in a train toilet, using a discreet chalk mark to indicate the wall panel behind which the Stasi employee among staff responsible for cleaning the train toilets should expect to retrieve the canister. Over the years tactics for transferring microfilmed documents were varied in order to reduce the risk of detection.

The ultimate head of East Germany's spy network in West Germany was the remarkable Markus Wolf. Novelist John le Carré denied for more than forty years that the fictional East German spy chief, Karla, was modeled on Wolf. Wolf became sufficiently intrigued by the quality and quantity of intelligence provided by "IM Gisela" to arrange a meeting. In 1975 Gast and "Schmidt" enjoyed one of their brief holiday breaks at Rabac, a resort on the Adriatic coast of what was then Jugoslavia, where they were joined at their rented seaside bungalow by the improbably slim and elegant spy chief. By her own account, Gast was impressed not merely by Wolf's charms, but also by his seeming openness, and willingness to accept that "the Communist countries had a long way to go before they could profit from socialism's inherent advantages". A form of friendship developed between Wolf and Gast. They had seven lengthy meetings over the years, each time carefully arranged with a combination of false and diplomatic passports, in comfortable out-of-the-way holiday spots where they could prepare their own meals – filled Russian-style pelmeni dumplings were said to be a favourite – and engage in detailed and very open discussions on politics, a topic on which, it seems, they were both fascinated and extremely well informed.

Further promotion within the BND followed the first meeting with Wolf. In her personal life, however, changes were afoot. She later told a court that around 1980 she became convinced that she would never marry and never have children of her own. She also decided to take into her own home her sister's five year old adopted child, in order to spare him from having to grow up in an orphanage. The challenge of bringing up the boy was increased because he suffered from what is now known as Cerebral palsy (... nimmt sie "einen damals fünf Jahre alten, spastisch gelähmten Jungen an"). The adoption represented an acknowledgement that there would never be a marriage with "Schmidt", and because she was sure she would never be able to leave the child behind it meant that the implicit option of escaping to the German Democratic Republic, should her espionage ever be uncovered in the west, was effectively closed off to her. She was, however, earning well, and was able to buy a small house near Munich in which she could look after her elder sister's child.

In January 1980, while on holiday with "Schmidt" in Innsbruck, Gast told her lover about her plans to take on care of her sister's child and her intention, accordingly, to step back from her work for the HVA. However, the message came through from the top that pulling back from providing information from her desk at the BND would also mean pulling back from the regular meetings with "Karliszek". That, evidently, was something that she was still not prepared to countenance and she agreed to continue passing information. The more senior she became in the West German intelligence services, the more valuable the information that she was able to provide became. Between 1980 and 1989 she made several further attempts to reduce or eliminate her spying activities for the East, but each time she was persuaded to persist with her stressful double life. There are suggestions that one of the objectives of the discreet but friendly face-to-face meetings with her friend Markus Wolf was to cajole and charm her into continuing her contributions.

There is also evidence that her political convictions had been shifting. In 1980 she applied to join the Socialist Unity Party ("Sozialistische Einheitspartei Deutschlands" / SED), the ruling party in the highly centralised East German one-party dictatorship. There is little indication that she had become a convinced Marxist, but she was committed to the belief, encouraged by her ultimate spy chief, Markus Wolf, that by acting as an information channel between the intelligence services of west and east Germany, she could see herself as a "scout for peace" ("Kundschafterin des Friedens "). He encouraged her to understand the extent to which her activities supported east-west detente. Applications for party membership from middle class professionals living in West Germany were not frequently submitted to the SED, which may explain why the party took six years to process her membership application. During the six year wait she enjoyed the status of a "candidate for party membership".

By the later 1980s, "Dr. Gabriele Leinfelder" had become extremely senior within her department at the BND. She had responsibility for reports sent to the Chancellor's office, the Foreign Ministry and the Defence Ministry. By 1986, as deputy head of the Soviet section, it was she who prepared the agency report on the possible participation of German firms in the construction of a major chemicals plant in Libya. Overall, Gast was able to pass copies of 49 detailed western intelligence reports to Wolf, covering topics that ranged from West Germany's internal economic challenges to analyses of Soviet politics and the impact of the Soviet space programme. Gast was also able to share the western intelligence services' analysis of the summit meeting between Presidents Reagan and Gorbachev with her eastern employers. In East Berlin her HVA handlers trusted her completely to identify which documents should be copied: there was no attempt to guide her selections.

=== Exposure and arrest ===
Karl-Christoph Großmann was a colonel in the East German HVA who was retired from the service in 1987 because his immoral life-style and propensity to gossip made him a security risk. In autumn 1989, Großmann had a meeting at the Grand Hotel in East Berlin with a former US presidential press secretary, John O. Koehler, whom he had known decades before when the two men were children at school together in Dresden. It is believed that over several months, starting in January 1990 (or earlier), Großmann caused consternation in the West German intelligence service by disclosing the extent to which it had been penetrated by HVA moles. Most sources are vague on the details of which spies he identified to precisely whom and when, though there are suggestions that Gabriele Gast would have known the details and timings of his disclosures more precisely than most people because of the extent to which relevant reports crossed her desk. One source states that Großmann disclosed "Agent Gisela's" identity and espionage role in September in 1990. He later denied accusations that he had been paid for the information.

Following the fall of the Berlin Wall in November 1989, it would have been clear to Gast that, regardless of Comrade Großmann's loose tongue, there were changes underway that would impact her regular meetings with "Karliszek". In September 1990 she got into her car and drove south for a final meeting with him in Austria, which was not then part of the European Economic Community and there were accordingly passport and customs formalities to be negotiated at the frontier. She was arrested as she reached the border crossing. It was also at the start of October 1990 that reunification came into effect.

The next year she faced trial and was sentenced by the "third Strafsenat" of the Bavarian High Court to six years and nine months in jail, along with forfeiture of certain statutory civil rights. She served most of her sentence between 1990 and 1994 in Munich's Stadelheim Prison and Aichach penitentiary. The monotony of prison life was interrupted by the requirement to appear at the trials of other former East German agents. As one report of the trial of Markus Wolf noted, she had been "let out [of the prison in Munich] so as to appear here". Wolf's well-publicised trial finally opened on 4 May 1993, and was the venue to which a succession of his reluctantly high-profile "top moles" were invited. As they entered court to testify, each shook Wolf's hand or nodded in greeting as they passed him apart from Gabriele Gast. She avoided even looking at him, as "The pain was still too great." After her interrogators told her that Karl-Heinz Schmidt was actually Karl-Heinz Schneider, she wrote Wolf a long letter, imploring that he tell her that there had been more to the affair with "Karliszek" than seventeen years as the victim of a professional Stasi seducer, mandated to do what was necessary to make sure she carried on providing her valuable intelligence information. Wolf never replied.

Gast was one of the first of the former East German spies to be sentenced after 1990, and the sentence she received was one of the harshest. That might have reflected in part on a perception that she was particularly dangerous, on account of her technical competence, political insight, and formidable analytical skills. However, by 1994 the idea was gaining traction that the East German spies had simply worked for their country in precisely the same way that West German spies might have been expected to work for theirs. That case was forcefully (and successfully) argued at the trial of Wolf himself. Gast's own sentence, by 1994, had included fifteen months in "intensified solitary confinement" (in "verschärfter Einzelhaft"). That year she received early release on probation. Her probation ended in 1998.

=== After prison ===
On her release she set about working on her personal story. She made contact with representatives of East German state power who had influenced her life, including Markus Wolf, "Karlicek" Schneider, and Großmann, whose betrayal had uncovered and ended her career as a double agent. She combined the resulting discussions and her own experiences into a volume entitled "Kundschafterin des Friedens" ("Scouts for Peace"), which was published in 1999. The title came from a phrase that Wolf had liked to use, when he referred to his network of overseas HVA informers. The book having been published, Gast moved on relatively quickly to the next chapter in her life, taking a job with an engineering firm.

The changes which led to reunification did nothing to reclaim Gast to the political centre-right. After her experiences of prison she has remained a communist, albeit a thoughtful one. She serves as deputy chair of the "Kundschafter des Friedens fordern Recht" initiative group. The group, founded in 1995, comprises people who served the German Democratic Republic intelligence services before 1989, and who reject the idea that they have any reason to be apologetic for their contributions:

- "The task of the East German spies was the protection of our country and its allies. Our task was not to win a war but to help prevent any such war. ... After the defeat of Socialism in Europe we continue to strive for peace ... [Our theme] is war and peace and the role of the secret services. ... After the Cold War ended the "peace dividend" failed to materialise. More wars were waged and the idiocies of the arms race continued while the secret services apply surveillance methods which technically they continue to perfect. Hubristic capitalism turns out to be not merely the scourge of the third world, but is dividing rich from poor ever more starkly even in the societies of the rich countries. It may well be that this capitalism has itself already passed its peak."
- "Die Kundschafter der DDR hatten die Aufgabe, das Land und ihre Verbündeten zu schützen. Unsere Aufgabe war nicht, einen Krieg zu gewinnen, sondern jeglichen Krieg zu verhindern helfen. Als Gruppe "Kundschafter des Friedens" setzen wir uns auch nach der Niederlage des Sozialismus in Europa weiterhin für den Frieden ein. So sind auch die Themenbereiche unserer Homepage: Krieg und Frieden und die Rolle der Geheimdienste. In unserer kleinen Presseschau wählen wir Artikel zu diesen Themen aus, die uns lesenswert erscheinen und die wir meistens mit einem Kurzkommentar versehen. In regelmäßigen Abständen schreiben unsere Mitglieder oder befreundete Besucher eigene Redaktionsbeiträge zu aktuellen Anlässen ... Nach dem Ende des Kalten Krieges hat es nicht die von manchen erwartete "Friedensdividende" gegeben. Kriege werden wieder geführt, der Rüstungsirrsinn geht weiter, die Geheimdienste arbeiten mit technisch immer perfekteren Überwachungsmethoden. Der übermütig gewordene Kapitalismus erweist sich nicht nur als Geißel der Dritten Welt; auch in den reichen Ländern spaltet sich die Gesellschaft immer mehr in Arm und Reich. Möglicherweise hat dieser Kapitalismus seinen Zenit aber bereits überschritten."
