= Hans Tiedge =

West German counter-intelligence official and East German spy

Hans-Joachim Tiedge (24 June 1937 in Berlin – 6 April 2011 near Moscow) was a head of West Germany's counter-intelligence in the Office for the Protection of the Constitution (BfV) in Cologne. His defection to the East on 19 August 1985 revealed him to be an East German spy. He had been recruited by Markus Wolf.

== History ==
In the four years prior to his defection, he was responsible for tracking down East German spies, but with little success. In the same period, the East Germans captured 168 West German spies. He was thought to have defected for personal reasons, as he had not, apparently, been discovered. His treachery was called the most damaging of the Cold War for the Federal Republic of Germany, resulting in the recall of numerous West German agents still in the field and plunging the West German counterespionage service into crisis.

Questions were raised as to how Tiedge managed to retain his position despite serious debts, family issues and a drinking problem. It was suspected that his superior, Herbert Hellenbroich may have assisted him in this. Hellenbroich resigned within weeks of the defection.

Days before German reunification, Tiedge was flown out to the Soviet Union by the Soviet occupying forces and subsequently lived near Moscow. He died on 6 April 2011.

Tiedge's defection was mentioned in the Phoenix Force novel The Doomsday Syndrome in 1986.
