= Georg Dertinger =

German politician (1902–1968)

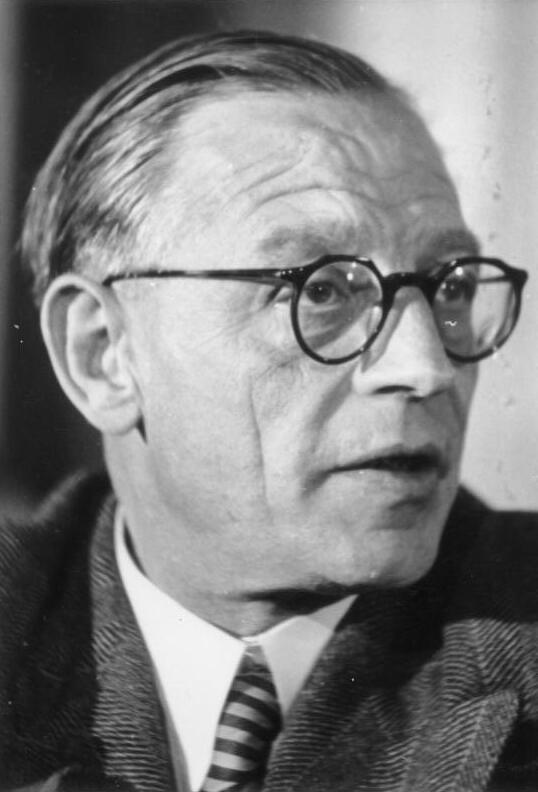

Foreign Minister of the GDR
- In office 11 October 1949 – 15 January 1953
- Preceded by: new office
- Succeeded by: Anton Ackermann

Personal details
- Born: 25 December 1902 Berlin, German Empire
- Died: 21 January 1968 (aged 65) Leipzig, East Germany
- Party: CDU
- Profession: Journalist

Georg Dertinger (25 December 1902 – 21 January 1968) was a German politician.

He was born in Berlin into a middle-class Protestant family. Dertinger briefly studied law and economics. After his study he became a journalist and later editor for the Magdeburger Volkszeitung and the nationalistic newspaper Der Stahlhelm. He broke with the Stahlhelm because of its rigid right-wing philosophy. He sympathized with the German National People's Party, a right-wing nationalist party.

Dertinger later became a member of the political circle around Chancellor Franz von Papen. He accompanied Papen to Rome as a journalist, a representative for the Hamburger Nachrichten, for the signature of the Reichskonkordat between Nazi Germany and the Holy See, shortly after Adolf Hitler's rise to power.

In 1934 Dertinger returned to Berlin and became publisher of Dienst aus Deutschland, a news agency that provided news to foreign newspapers.

After World War II Dertinger co-founded the Christian Democratic Union (CDU) in the Soviet occupation zone of Germany. From 1946 to 1949 he was General Secretary of the East-German CDU and from 1949 to 1953 Vice-Chairman of the party. He supported the official line of co-operation with the Socialist Unity Party and opposed the more independent-minded party chairman Jakob Kaiser, whom he had deposed in December 1947.

Dertinger also joined the Cultural Association of the DDR (Kulturbund) and was a member of the Cultural Association's Presidential Council.

On 11 October 1949 he became East Germany's first Minister of Foreign Affairs in Otto Grotewohl's cabinet However, he tended to be only a figurehead to secure CDU participation in the SED-dominated National Front and most important decisions would be made by his eventual successor Anton Ackermann. In 1950 he signed the Oder-Neisse Treaty with Poland, that arranged the borderline between East Germany and the Polish People's Republic.

On 15 January 1953 Dertinger was arrested due to his allegedly harmful activities against East Germany and in 1954 he was tried on a show trial for espionage, found guilty and sentenced to hard labor (15 years). In 1964 he was given amnesty. The years before his death he worked for the Roman Catholic St. Benno publishing house.
