= Anton Ackermann =

German politician (1905–1973)

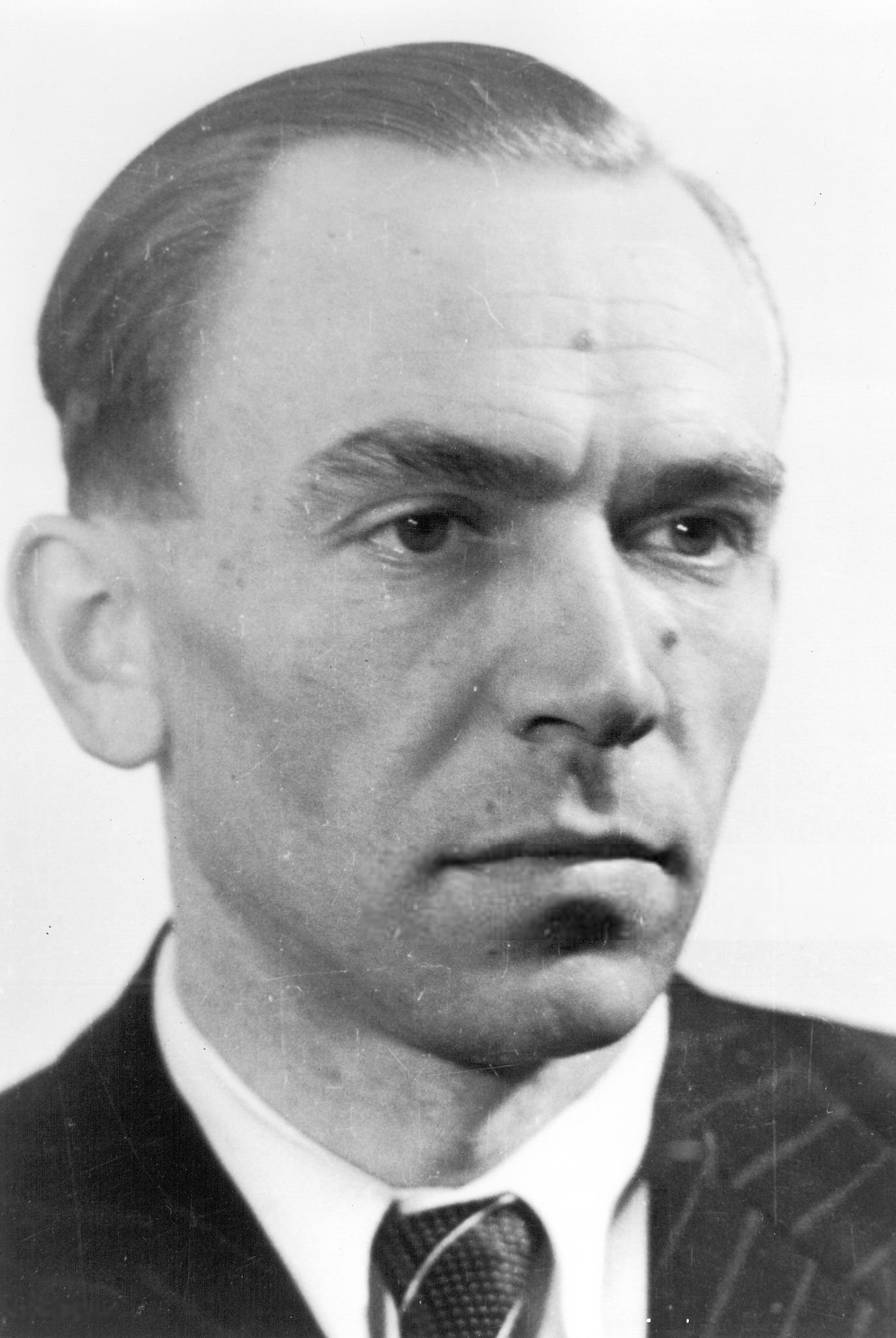
- Portrait by Abraham Pisarek c. 1950

Minister for Foreign Affairs
- Acting; 15 January 1953 – 1 October 1953
- Minister-President: Otto Grotewohl
- Preceded by: Georg Dertinger
- Succeeded by: Lothar Bolz

Director of the Institute for Economic Research
- In office 16 August 1951 – 1 December 1952
- Deputy: Richard Stahlmann
- Preceded by: Office established
- Succeeded by: Markus Wolf

Member of the Volkskammer
- In office 18 March 1948 – 17 October 1954
- Preceded by: Constituency established
- Succeeded by: Multi-member district

Party Executive Committee Central Secretariat responsibilities
- 1946–1949: Agitation
- 1946–1949: Culture
- 1946–1949: Propaganda
- 1946–1949: Sports
- 1946–1949: Public Education

Personal details
- Born: Eugen Hanisch; 25 November 1905 Thalheim, Kingdom of Saxony, German Empire
- Died: 4 May 1973 (aged 67) East Berlin, East Germany
- Resting place: Zentralfriedhof Friedrichsfelde
- Party: KPD (1920–1946); SED (after 1946)
- Spouse(s): Elli Schmidt (m. 1932; div. 1949) Irmgard Kuske (m. 1949)
- Children: 2
- Education: International Lenin School
- Occupation: Politician
- Central institution membership: 1949–1953: Candidate member, Politburo of the Central Committee; 1946–1954: Full member, Central Committee (Note: Party Executive Committee until 1950); 1935–1937: Candidate member, KPD Politburo; 1935–1946: Full member, KPD Central Committee; Other offices held: 1960–1961: Deputy Chairman, State Planning Commission; 1953–1954: Deputy Minister, Ministry for Culture; 1953: Director, Institute for Marxism-Leninism; 1949–1953: State Secretary, Ministry for Foreign Affairs

Anton Ackermann (born Eugen Hanisch; 25 November 1905 – 4 May 1973) was a German communist politician who was a leading functionary of the Communist Party of Germany (KPD) and the Socialist Unity Party of Germany (SED). He served as the first director of the Institute for Economic Research, East Germany's first foreign intelligence service, from 1951 to 1952, and briefly acted as Minister of Foreign Affairs in 1953.

== Life and career ==
=== Weimar era ===
Ackermann, the son of a hosier, also worked as a hosier and a labourer after completing elementary school. At the same time, he began his political career in the Free Socialist Youth (FSJ) of the Social Democratic Party. From 1920 to 1928, he worked as functionary of the Communist Youth League of Germany. In 1926 he joined the Communist Party of Germany.

From 1929 to 1931, Ackermann attended the International Lenin School in Moscow, where he remained as an aspirant until 1933. Back in Germany, he then worked in the Germany Department of the Communist International as a personal aide to Fritz Heckert and Wilhelm Pieck. There he met Elli Schmidt, with whom he had two children and lived as husband and wife until their separation in 1949.

=== Nazi era ===
After the Nazis entered government, Ackermann worked illegally for the now-banned KPD in Berlin from 1933 to 1935, including as John Schehr's secretary. In 1935, Ackermann emigrated to Prague and remained there until 1937. At the KPD's Brussels Conference in October 1935, he was elected to the Party's central committee and as a candidate member of the Politbüro.

In 1937, during the Spanish Civil War, Ackermann worked as director of the Political School of the International Brigades in Benicàssim. After a stay in Paris, he went to Moscow in 1940. There he became editor of the newspaper Das freie Wort. In 1941 he worked with German prisoners of war and co-founded the Moscow-based National Committee for a Free Germany (NKFD). From 1941 to 1945 he directed the 'Free Germany' radio station. In 1945 he was awarded the Order of the Red Star.

=== Soviet occupation ===
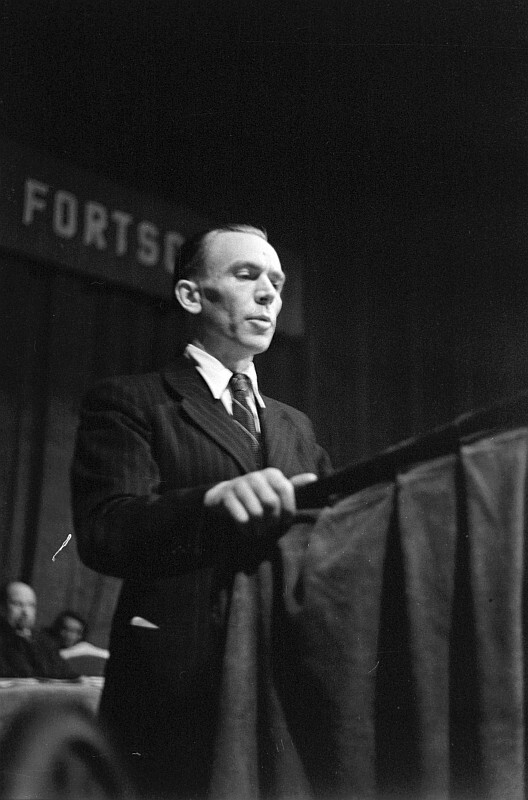
Ackermann gives a speech at the 15th Party Congress of the Communist Party of Germany, April 1946

After World War II, at the end of April 1945, Ackermann returned to Saxony as head of the Ackermann Group, one of the three teams, each of ten men, flown in by the Communist Party from Moscow to different parts of the Soviet occupation zone to lay the groundwork for the Soviet Military Administration in Germany. He joined the newly reformed East German Communist party, the Socialist Unity Party (SED) in 1946.

=== East Germany ===
Ackermann was elected into the Central Committee and became a candidate member of the Politburo in 1949. From 1948 to 1954, he was a member of the Volkskammer and its preceding bodies.

Ackermann suggested that because the new state created out of the Soviet occupation would be a "progressive state" constituted from anti-fascist principles, it would not be a hindrance to the eventual progression towards socialism and therefore Germany could have a peaceful, reformist transition towards socialism. Though this was in line with a general rightward turn in the official communist parties following the Second World War, it would eventually be repudiated amidst the Soviet-Yugoslav split.

From 1949 to 1953, Ackermann was the Deputy Minister of Foreign Affairs. After the arrest of his superior, Georg Dertinger, Ackermann briefly succeeded him as Minister. He also briefly served as director of the Institute for Marxism-Leninism in 1953, and as the first director of the Institute for Economic Research, the predecessor of the Main Directorate for Reconnaissance, East Germany's foreign intelligence service, from 1951 to 1952. He was succeeded by his protégé, Markus Wolf.

In 1953–1954, he was expelled from the Politburo and Central Committee and fired as minister because of his factional opposition to party leader Walter Ulbricht.

In 1956 he was rehabilitated and worked for the State Planning Commission.

=== Death and Burial ===
On 4 May 1973, Anton Ackermann, who was by then suffering terribly from cancer, committed suicide at the age of 67. His urn was interred in the perimeter wall of the 'Memorial to the Socialists' at the Friedrichsfelde Central Cemetery in East Berlin.

== Honours and Legacy ==
He was awarded the Patriotic Order of Merit in silver in 1957 and in gold in 1965. In 1970 he was awarded the Order's honorary clasp.

In his home town of Thalheim, the 10-class polytechnic high school was given the name Anton-Ackermann High School in 1979. After German reunification, it reverted to Thalheim High School.

On 8 January 1985, a commemorative stamp appeared with his portrait, as part of a series celebrating figures of the German labor movement.

== See also ==
- Wilhelm Zaisser
- Heinrich Rau
