= Matthias Warnig =

German businessman and associate of Vladimir Putin, former Stasi agent

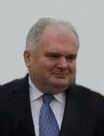
- Warnig in 2010
- Born: Matthias Warnig; July 26, 1955 (age 71); Altdöbern, East Germany
- Education: The Berlin University of Economics
- Occupations: Businessman; Investor
- Years active: 1991–present
- Known for: former Managing Director of Nord Stream AG and Nord Stream 2 AG

Artur Matthias Warnig (born 26 July 1955) is a former East German Stasi officer and a Russia-based businessman who has worked closely with Vladimir Putin. He joined the Stasi, the secret police of communist East Germany, in 1974. During the Cold War he engaged in financial crimes by attempting to infiltrate and spy against banks in the Federal Republic of Germany (West Germany). After the Stasi was disbanded following the unification of Germany, he was left unemployed and moved to Russia, where he took part in business ventures in cooperation with Putin, whom he had already known as a Stasi officer.

He was managing director (CEO) of Nord Stream AG, a company that is majority-owned by the Russian government and that is responsible for the construction and operation of the Nord Stream undersea gas pipeline from Russia to Germany. He was managing director of Nord Stream 2 AG. Warnig is under personal sanctions in the United States over his ties to the Russian government and Putin, and what the US government considers to be a Russian geopolitical project. As of 2023 he is also under personal sanctions in the United Kingdom as a collaborator with the Putin regime who is "involved in destabilising Ukraine or undermining or threatening the territorial integrity, sovereignty or independence of Ukraine, or obtaining a benefit from or supporting the Government of Russia."

== Early life and education ==
Matthias Warnig was born on 26 July 1955 in Altdöbern (Senftenberg), Lower Lusatia (Niederlausitz in German), East Germany. At 18 years old, he was the secretary of the local Free German Youth (FDJ) which was the East German equivalent to Komsomol. Before graduating from school, he joined the ruling Socialist Unity Party, but, instead of serving in the National People's Army (NVA), he underwent six months of training in the Stasi guard regiment and often is referred to as Stasi from Brandenburg.

== Career ==
In 1974 Warnig started his career at the Stasi, the secret police of communist East Germany, and entered its foreign intelligence (HVA) on April 1, 1975. (Note: According to Warnig's STASI personnel file (German: Kaderkarteikarte), his code names include Hans Detleff, Arthur from 9 January 1986, and Ökonom (economist) from 3 July 1976.) In September 1977, he began his studies in economics at the Berlin University of Economics, which is also known as the Bruno Leuschner School of Economics, and graduated with a degree in economics in 1981. (Note: Bruno Leuschner assisted in establishing the economic department of the Communist Party of Germany (KPD).) He allegedly worked as the Deputy Chief of the Science and Technology Sector (STS) (German: Sektors Wissenschaft und Technik (SWT)), which is often referred to as industrial espionage or economic espionage (German: Wirtschaftsspionage) under Horst Vogel in A XIII of the HVA, headed the work group Department 5 (Referat 5 / SWT) and attempted to obtain information from the West about materials technology, chemistry, electronics, physics and nuclear power. (Note: Werner Stiller, who worked in the Science and Technology Sector (SWT) (German: Sektors Wissenschaft und Technik (SWT)) in A XIII from 1972 until early 1979, defected to the Federal Intelligence Service (BND) on 19 January 1979 taking with him a vast amount of information about SWT and A XIII.) (Note: In 1986, the Referat 5 / SWT, HV A/X which was under Horst Vogel, the KGB, the Bulgarian State Security (DS), and other Comecon friendly security services allegedly were involved in Operation Denver and, according to DS files, also known as Operation Pandemic (Bulgarian: Пандемия) which is an Eastern Bloc active measure disinformation campaign about HIV/AIDS that occurred while Frank Carlucci, the Centers for Disease Control and Prevention and Kathleen Bailey had exposed the hoax as untrue.) Warnig allegedly worked with KGB officer Vladimir Putin. (Note: On 24 January 1989, both Vladimir Putin and Matthias Warnig are in the same photo during Operation Luch which is on page 71 of Appendices of Stasi Documents from Validmir Putin, Operation Luch and Matthias Warnig: The Secret KGB-Stasi Relationship. From 1985 to 1990, Putin often worked at the Dresden KGB headquarters building located at Angelikastraße 4.) (Note: Swiss authorities assume that the Zug lawyer Urs J. Hausheer (Ursus Josef Hausheer) was very close to Vladimir Putin. Hausheer graduated from the University of Zurich in 1975, received his license as an attorney in the Canton of Zug in 1976, became a CVP politician, and from 1987 to 1990 was on the board of directors of Asada AG, which had close contacts with the "Commercial Coordination" department of the GDR foreign exchange collector Alexander Schalck-Golodkowski, engaged in procurement for the Ministry of State Security of the GDR (Stasi), was owned by the pro-Stasi Michael Grossauer with support from Ernst A. Brandenberg, and thus bypassed the restrictions of CoCom. Hausheer is on the board of directors of Nordstream, which was founded on 2 December 2005 in Zug as the North-European Gas Pipeline Company (NEGPC), and acts as an agent and trustee for numerous companies founded in Zug.) The two men collaborated on recruiting West German citizens for the KGB. Warnig, however, has denied this by saying that they met for the first time in 1991, when Putin was the head of the Committee for External Relations of the Saint Petersburg Mayor's Office.

In the late 1970s, Warnig received five years of training on how to infiltrate banks in West Germany.

Warnig was in West Germany to gain "economic enlightenment" from such companies as BASF, Rheinbraun, Data Becker, Thyssen, Krupp, and Deutsche Bank.

Warnig had apparently spied on Dresdner Bank AG in West Germany for two years in the late 1980s before he began to work in the bank.

From 1986 onward Warnig was a resident of Düsseldorf living in an apartment in the district of Bilk as a trade representative of the GDR.

=== After German reunification ===
After the fall of Communism he resigned as a major from the Stasi in 1989.

Dresdner Bank attempted to get a banking operating license in Saint Petersburg, where Putin was now in charge of foreign economic relations. Warnig took part in negotiations. The office was opened in 1991. Warnig became chairman of the Board of Directors of Dresdner Bank ZAO, Dresdner Bank Russian's subsidiary. (Note: From 1997 to 1999, Warnig served as deputy manager of the Moscow branch of BNP - Dresdner Bank (from 1997 - CJSC), from 1999 to 2000 he was general director of the BNP - Dresdner Bank branch in St. Petersburg. From 2000 to 2002, Warnig was the chief coordinator of the bank group in Russia (since 2001 - ZAO Dresdner Bank). After Dresdner Kleinwort Benson, a subsidiary of the investment arm of the Dresdner Bank group, acquired the American investment bank Wasserstein Perella on 4 January 2001, it was renamed Dresdner Kleinwort Wasserstein which became the group's investment bank. The Moscow LLC Dresdner Kleinwort Benson also re-registered, becoming LLC Dresdner Kleinwort Wassersteen (DrKW), whose main coordinator for Russia was Warnig. In March 2002, he became president of JSC Dresdner Bank, and in 2003, JSC Dresdner Bank merged with DrKW, and Warnig became head of all divisions of the group.) (Note: Irina Vladmirovna Krivosheeva (Russian: Ирина Владимировна Кривошеева; born 28 September 1977, Moscow) graduated from Financial University under the Government of the Russian Federation (FinU) in 1997, received training at in the Department of Microeconomics at the University of Eichstätt-Ingolstadt in Germany in 1997 and 1998 majoring in international financial markets, and, in 2003, received Ph.D. in Economics from FinU where she did her postgraduate studies from 1999 to 2003 writing the thesis "Collective Investment Institutions: World Experience in Creation and Functioning" (Russian: "Институты коллективного инвестирования: мировой опыт создания и функционирования"). She was hired as a Trader Assistant in the Investment Department of Dresdner Bank in Frankfurt and later became a Corporate Account Manager at Dresdner Kleinwort Benson (investment division of Dresdner Bank) in Moscow. In 2000, she moved to the management company Deutscher Investments Trust (DIT) (Russian: ООО "Дойчер Инвестмент Траст" ("ДИТ")) and was its CEO from 2002 until 2005 while Matthias Warnig was on its supervisory board from 2001 to 2004. On 5 January 2007, Deutscher Investments Trust (DIT) became part of Allianz Global Investors (AllianzGI) (German: Allianz Global Investors Kapitalanlagegesellschaft (AllianzGI)). She was the First Deputy General Director of the Allianz ROSNO Asset Management Company from 2004 to 2006 and currently is the General Director of LLC Manager company "Alfa-Capital", which was established in 1996 and had been a check fund that was established in 1992, of the Alfa Group.) In 2004–05, the bank advised on the controversial forced sale of Yukos assets (see Yukos shareholders v. Russia).

In 2006 he changed to Nord Stream AG, operator of the first Baltic Sea gas pipeline from Russia to Germany until May 2016. From 2015 until July 2023 he was CEO of Nord Stream 2 AG.

As of 2014, Warnig was on the board of directors of Bank Rossiya which is often referred to as "Putin's Wallet".

During violent gang wars involving the Tambov Gang while it was taking control of St. Petersburg's energy trade in the 1990s, Vladimir Putin, fearing for the safety of his daughters Maria Vorontsova and Katerina Tikhonova, sent them to Germany, where Warnig served as their legal guardian.

From 2012, Warnig led the supervisory board of the Russian aluminum company Rusal but was forced to resign in 2018, when the first Trump administration imposed sanctions on Rusal.

=== Sanctions ===
Warnig was from 2006 until May 2016 managing director (CEO) of Nord Stream AG, which is majority-owned by the Russian government and responsible for the construction and operation of the Nord Stream undersea gas pipeline from Russia to Germany. Warnig and Nordstream AG were under personal sanctions in the United States over his ties to the Russian government and Putin, and what the US government considered to be a Russian geopolitical project. The Biden administration lifted those in May 2021. Sanctions were reimposed on him on February 23, 2022, in response to the 2021–2022 Russo-Ukrainian crisis and the Russian invasion of Ukraine. Warnig was managing director of Nord Stream 2 AG since the company was established in 2006 until July 2023.

On 24 February 2023, the UK government also sanctioned Warnig in relation to the Russo-Ukrainian War.

== Personal life ==
According to Warnig's STASI personnel file (German: Kaderkarteikarte), he speaks French and Russian in addition to German.

Warnig married on his 24th birthday, soon afterwards his son Stefan and his daughter Claudia were born. Warnig is now married to the Russian Elena Semjonova, whom he met in Saint Petersburg at the end of the 1990s. They have two sons, the family lives in Staufen im Breisgau and as of 2023 the couple still had condominiums in Saint Petersburg and Moscow. His son Stefan Warnig was the owner and chef of a café in Berlin-Schöneberg, the "Café des Artistes", which was considered to be Putin's favorite restaurant in Germany.
