= Werner Großmann =

German Stasi general (1929–2022)

- Born: 9 March 1929; Oberebenheit, Saxony, Germany
- Died: 28 January 2022 (aged 92); Berlin, Germany
- Occupation: Deputy Minister for State Security
- Espionage activity
- Allegiance: East Germany
- Service years: 1952–1990
- Rank: Generaloberst

Werner Großmann (9 March 1929 – 28 January 2022) was a German deputy leader of the Ministry for State Security (Stasi).

== Biography ==
Born in Oberebenheit, Saxony, Großmann started his career as a bricklayer, but in 1952 he joined the Ministry for State Security where he studied political and military espionage. He rose rapidly in the ranks and was promoted to deputy division leader of military espionage in 1956, becoming division leader in 1962.

In 1983, he was promoted to deputy head of the General Reconnaissance Administration (HVA), the foreign espionage arm of the Stasi. In 1986 when Markus Wolf retired, Großmann was promoted to head of the HVA and deputy minister of state security. In 1989, he was awarded the rank of Generaloberst. When the Stasi was dissolved in 1990, Großmann, like all other members, lost his position. Großmann appeared at several events organised by The Left political party.

Großmann died in Berlin on 28 January 2022, at the age of 92.
