= Susanne Schädlich =

German writer and literary translator (born 1965)

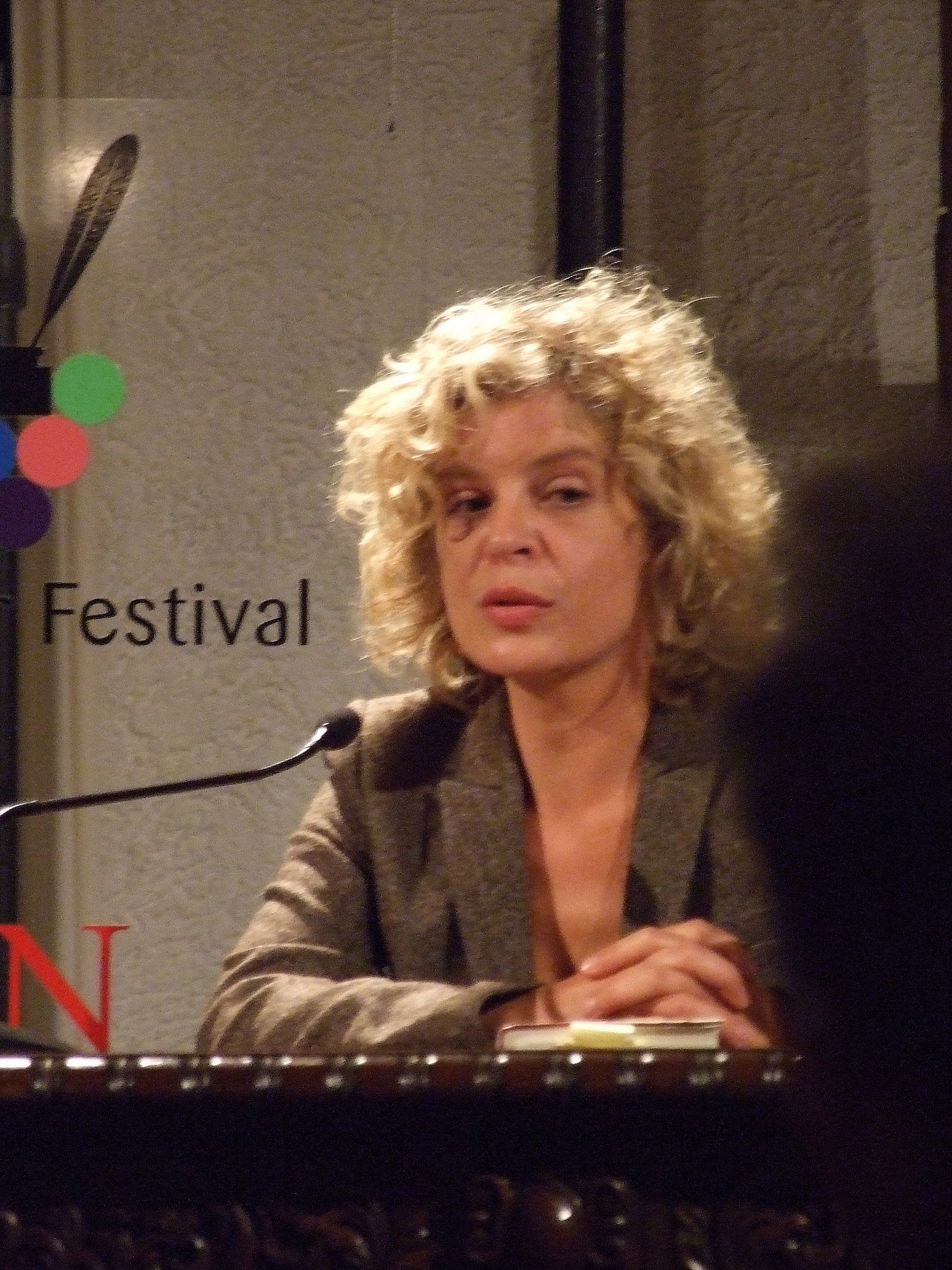
Schädlich in 2009

Susanne Schädlich (born 29 November 1965) is a German writer and literary translator. She is also experienced as a "ghost writer".

The daughter of a high-profile East German dissident intellectual, she came to wider prominence with her 2009 book "Immer wieder Dezember. Der Westen, die Stasi, der Onkel und ich" (loosely "December, always December. The west, the Stasi, the uncle and I") in which she tells the story of her childhood in the two Germanies during the Cold War, and the impact of discovering that her trusted and loved uncle (who later killed himself on a Berlin park bench) had been spying on her family through much of her childhood in order to report on them to the widely detested Ministry for State Security apparatus (Stasi).

== Early life and education ==
Susanne Schädlich was born in Jena, in the southern part of the German Democratic Republic (East Germany). The family relocated while she was still small. Until December 1977, she and her younger sister Anna grew up with their parents in Köpenick, a quarter near the centre of East Berlin. Hans Joachim Schädlich, her father, is an author. Her mother, born Krista Maria Hübner, worked as a publisher's editor. Susanne Schädlich's maternal grandfather, Arno Hübner, was a university law professor.

- "Like many children of East German intellectuals I ... was always on my guard. At home my parents always spoke openly about writers critical of the government. We watched West German television. My father hosted meetings between East German and West German authors and co-signatories of the petition against the deprivation of national citizenship right inflicted on the poet-singer Wolf Biermann. So I knew how you had to conduct yourself outside the house."
- "Wie viele Kinder ostdeutscher Intellektueller war ich ... immer auf der Hut. Zuhause sprachen meine Eltern immer offen über regimekritische Schriftsteller. Wir sahen westdeutsches Fernsehen. Mein Vater war Gastgeber des Treffens ost-westdeutscher Autoren und Unterzeichner der Protest-Petition gegen die Ausweisung des Dichters und Sängers Wolf Biermann. Ich wusste also, wie man sich außerhalb des Hauses verhalten musste."
Susanne Schädlich interviewed by Rory MacLean in 2009

The sudden move from East Berlin to West Germany was a shock for the twelve year old:

- "My whole life changed overnight. I had to leave behind my school, my friends, my darling grandmother. I found myself surrounded by people who spoke my language, but from whom I sensed no understanding. My sense of homeland was divided in two."
- "Mein ganzes Leben veränderte sich von einem Tag auf den anderen“, sagt sie. „Ich musste meine Schule, meine Freundinnen, meine geliebte Großmutter zurücklassen. Ich fand mich inmitten von Menschen wieder, die zwar meine Sprache sprachen, aber von denen ich mich nicht verstanden fühlte. Meine Heimat war zweigeteilt."
Susanne Schädlich interviewed by Rory MacLean in 2009

During the 1970s, her father was establishing himself as an East German writer. The authorities found his first novel unacceptably critical of the regime. In order to get it published he had to smuggle it across into West Germany. Its publication in Hamburg instantly turned Hans Joachim Schädlich into a public enemy ("Staatsfeind"). His East German publishing contract was abruptly terminated and he lost his job with the (East) German Academy of Sciences and Humanities. He was even prevented from working as a taxi driver. He was threatened with imprisonment. However, his friendship with the well-known West German author Günter Grass led to concerns that his imprisonment might trigger criticism of the East German government in the west. Instead of setting up a show trial for Schädlich, in December 1977 the authorities let him know that he might – and indeed should – leave the country. Five days later Susanne Schädlich and her family relocated to West Germany, where they settled, initially, in Hamburg. Later she moved on to West Berlin. Susanne Schädlich was twelve at this time. She was aware in general terms of the problems her parents were having with the authorities, and although they assumed their telephone was bugged and that they were under some level of surveillance, Hans Joachim and Krista Maria Schädlich still discussed the issues of the day in the presence of their children. Her father had been one of those who had been so enraged by the unjust treatment of Wolf Biermann the previous year that he had signed the petition objecting to Biermann being stripped of his citizenship. Although she was surprised at the speed of the family's expulsion to the west when it happened, the cause of it was clear to her even at the time.

How the German Democratic Republic continues to resonate through the schools system:

- "After the so-called changes [of 1989/90] the East German teachers were taken into the schools service [of the reunited Germany largely without any vetting. In Berlin alone around 15,000. And no, that will not be sorted out any time soon, as mischievous tongues want us to believe. Some are still only in their mid-to-late fories. Fresh out of teacher training college in 1990.
- "Nach der sogenannten Wende wurden die DDR-Lehrer in den Schuldienst übernommen, größtenteils ungeprüft. In Berlin allein etwa 15.000. Und nein, das erledigt sich nicht bald biologisch, wie böse Zungen gleich einwenden mögen. Etliche Lehrer sind nämlich erst Mitte/Ende Vierzig. Hatten ihre Lehrausbildung 1990 gerade beendet.."
Susanne Schädlich speaking on Deutschlandradio Kultur in 2009

It took some time for Schädlich to settle in the west. In the 1970s an easterner attending a school in Hamburg was unusual. At home the East German Ministry for States Security (Stasi) did not leave the family alone. There were, according to Schädlich, attempts to kidnap her father and force him back over to the east. Her father developed psychological problems and her parents split up. Only when she moved to West Berlin where her father was living from 1979, did she begin to feel "at home in the west". In 1985, when she was trying without success to find a teaching job in the west, her uncle found her an apprenticeship in clothes manufacturing in East Berlin. She went for an interview and found herself ending up in an office of the Ministry for State Security (MfS) where she was urged to renounce her West German citizenship. Realising in time that she was in danger of being trapped again behind the wall Schädlich turned down the job and hastened back to the west. It would be another seven years before she joined the dots and realised that there had been more to Uncle Karlheinz's's support with her search for work than she had understood at the time.

- " East Germany was a forty year dictatorship. But after 1961 most of its 17 million citizens did nothing about it. If you remind them of this fact today, when you tell the truth [about it], they feel personally attacked. They feel guilty. That makes it difficult to talk of the coercian and cowardice. Also it leads to a nostalgia – 'Ostalgia' – for the past and an idealisation of the political reality in the 'Democratic Republic'. That's dangerous, because a whole lot of former Stasi spies and officers hold positions [of influence] in politics and public service."
- "Ostdeutschland war vierzig Jahre lang eine Diktatur. Aber nach 1961 taten die meisten seiner 17 Millionen Bürger nichts dagegen. Wenn man sie heute an diese Tatsache erinnert, wenn man die Wahrheit sagt, fühlen sie sich persönlich angegriffen. Sie fühlen sich schuldig. Dies macht es schwer, über Zwang und Feigheit zu sprechen. Außerdem führt dies zu einer Nostalgie, oder Ostalgie, für die Vergangenheit und einer Idealisierung der politischen Realität in der DDR. Dies ist gefährlich, da eine Reihe ehemaliger Stasi-Mitglieder und Spitzel Positionen in der Politik und im Öffentlichen Dienst innehat."
Susanne Schädlich interviewed by Rory MacLean in 2009

During Schädlich's childhood Uncle Karlheinz was "always there". Karlheinz was slightly more than four years older than her father. Uncle Karlheinz had "great presence". He was a philanderer and a historian. He spoke English "better than Queen Elizabeth". He smoked British tobacco and dressed in tweed. He flirted shamelessly with younger women and would stay chatting in the Schädlich 's apartment till late into the night. His great hero was Kim Philby, a British intelligence agent who had betrayed hundreds of western spies to Soviet intelligence. In 1992, slightly more than two years after the wall fell, Hans Joachim Schädlich, researching "his" files in the recently opened up Stasi archives, discovered that for more than ten years his brother had been spying on his family and friends. Uncle Karlheinz's award-winning career as a Stasi as a "Inoffizieller Mitarbeiter" (IM) had begun in 1974 with the betrayal of a young man planning to escape to the west, who had in consequence been arrested and sentenced to a prison term. The most famous target of Uncle Karlheinz's espionage had been his brother's friend Günter Grass.

After her previously loved and respected uncle was unmasked, in 1992, as the man who had spied on her family, Schädlich broke off contact. She was asked about this.

- "I think [re-establishing contact] was a step for him to take. For many years he lived in Berlin not far away from me. He knew my address, probably also my telephone number. But he never stirred himself to make contact.And it was certainly not my job to ring on his doorbell to ask for the honour of a talk."
- "Ich finde, dass er den Schritt hätte unternehmen müssen. Er wohnte viele Jahre nicht weit von mir in Berlin, er kannte meine Adresse, wahrscheinlich auch meine Telefonnummer. Er hat sich aber niemals in meine Richtung bewegt. Und es war ja doch nicht meine Aufgabe, bei ihm anzuklopfen und zu fragen, ob er so gnädig wäre, mit mir zu sprechen. "
Susanne Schädlich interviewed by Susanne Beyer und Volker Hage in 2009

== Career ==
Shortly before her uncle's unmasking Schädlich moved to the United States for a stay that, in the end, lasted eleven years. Distance did nothing to soften for her the lasting shock which hit all the family members. Karlheinz Schädlich's spying on family and friends nevertheless came as a complete surprise to his three younger siblings and their families. Schädlich settled in Los Angeles where she took a succession of jobs over the next few years. This enabled her to perfect her English to the point at which she was able to publish her first literary translations. One of the places at which she worked during her time in America was at the Max Kade Institute for Austrian-German-Swiss Studies in Los Angeles, where she was an academic researcher. In 1996 she obtained a bursary from the University of Southern California which enabled her to study modern German philology. She returned to Germany in 1999 and has lived in Berlin since then, undertaking regular assignments in the United States.

Although the shock of her father's discoveries about Karlheinz Schädlich's betrayals was enduring, it was only after her uncle stuck a revolver in his mouth while sitting on a park bench in Berlin and killed himself at the end of 2007 that she felt compelled to record the whole affair in an autobiographical work which was published in 2008/9 as "Immer wieder Dezember. Der Westen, die Stasi, der Onkel und ich" (loosely "December, always December. The west, the Stasi, the uncle and I").

== Books ==
- "Immer wieder Dezember. Der Westen, die Stasi, der Onkel und ich"
- "Herr Hübner und die sibirische Nachtigall" ("Dietrich Hübner and the Siberian Nightingale") 2014 "documentary-novel", in which the eponymous protagonist shares her mother's maiden name.
- "Briefe ohne Unterschrift": Wie eine BBC-Sendung die DDR herausforderte, 2017

== Recent awards (selection) ==
- 2009: nominated for the Scholl siblings prize (with Immer wieder Dezember.)
- 2010: Max Kade German Writer in Residence at Dickinson College Carlisle (USA)
- 2011: Max Kade German Writer in Residence at the Oberlin College, Ohio (USA)
- 2011/ 2012: Literature stipendium of the Prussian Maritime Trade Foundation (Stiftung Preußische Seehandlung)
- 2012: Literature stipendium of the city of Berlin
- 2015: Johann Gottfried Seume literature prize
