= Main Directorate for Reconnaissance =

Foreign intelligence service of the German Democratic Republic

- Hauptverwaltung Aufklärung (HVA)
- Seal of the Ministry of State Security

Agency overview
- Formed: November 1955
- Dissolved: 13 January 1990
- Type: Intelligence agency
- Headquarters: Lichtenberg, East Berlin, East Germany
- Agency executives: Anton Ackermann (1951–1952); Markus Wolf (1952–1986); Werner Großmann (1986–1990)
- Parent agency: Ministry of State Security

The Main Directorate for Reconnaissance (German: Hauptverwaltung Aufklärung; German: HVA, German pronunciation: [haːfaʊ̯ˈaː]) was the foreign intelligence service of the Ministry of State Security (Stasi), the main security agency of the German Democratic Republic (East Germany), from 1955 to 1990.

The HVA was an integral part of the Stasi, responsible for operations outside of East Germany such as espionage, active measures, foreign intelligence gathering, and counterintelligence against NATO-aligned countries and their intelligence agencies.

The Stasi was disbanded in January 1990 and the HVA's mode of operation was revealed to the public, including its internal structure, methods, and employees. The HVA became the subject of broad interest and intensive research under the responsibilities of the Federal Commissioner for the Stasi Records. The HVA is regarded by some as the most effective foreign intelligence service during the Cold War and the second largest after Soviet Union's intelligence forces. It provided up to 80 percent of all information about NATO countries before the Warsaw Pact, according to the CIA.

== Predecessors ==
In 1951, the Außenpolitischer Nachrichtendienst (Foreign Intelligence Service) (APN) was founded, under the leadership of Anton Ackermann, disguised as the Institut für wirtschaftswissenschaftliche Forschung (IPW) (Institute for Economic Research). According to Markus Wolf, eight Germans and four Soviet "advisers" were present at the founding on 1 September 1951 in Bohnsdorf in the borough of Treptow-Köpenick. The APN was subordinated to the GDR Foreign Ministry. The first leader was Ackermann, his deputy was Richard Stahlmann. The head of the "advisers" was the KGB officer Andrei Grauer, who, according to Wolf, had been personally assigned by Stalin to this "reconstruction aid."

In 1952, the APN College (the later HVA College) came into being, where agents known as "scouts for peace" (Kundschafter des Friedens) in Stasi jargon were prepared for operations in Western countries. Toward the end of the year, Ackermann petitioned the ruling party's Politburo to replace him, and Walter Ulbricht assumed direct control of the APN.

== Duties ==
=== Focus ===
The primary mandate of the HVA was foreign reconnaissance (espionage), which included political, military, economic and technological intelligence-gathering. Among its other duties were activities against western intelligence agencies (by means of infiltrating their operations), preparing acts of sabotage, as well as the so-called "Active Measures" (distributing false intelligence) in the "Operational Sector Federal Republic of Germany", including West Berlin.

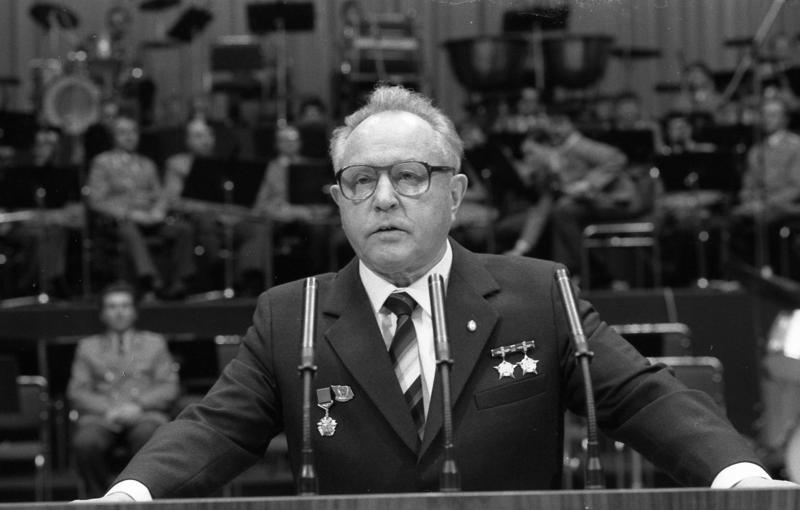
Mielke addressing the SV Dynamo, March 25, 1983.

In the early 1980s, military espionage began to gain significance. The Soviet Union, the SED-led administration of the German Democratic Republic, and secretary of national security Erich Mielke expected paramount information in regard to the early discovery of Western war preparations from the HVA, in light of the rising tensions between the two Cold War superpowers.

=== Cooperation with the KGB ===
Optimal conditions allowed the HVA to provide its eastern "sister services", especially the KGB, the greatest amount of intelligence flowing out of the Federal Republic of Germany. The KGB was headquartered in Berlin-Karlshorst, the Soviet Union's secret service was located in Potsdam-Babelsberg, and in addition, liaisons were present to each district administration. Successful operations against NATO headquarters in Brussels, as well as some other Western European states, such as the United Kingdom, also contributed to the HVA's significance. In the United States, on the contrary, the HVA was never able to break any ground, as the KGB operated there almost exclusively (the significant inroads in the GDR's reconnaissance on, for example, the NSA originated from personnel stationed in West Berlin).

== Organisation and structure ==
=== Sections ===
In 1989 the HVA had 21 sections (Abteilungen) and five task forces (Arbeitsgruppen). In addition, there was the Headquarters of the HVA (Stab der HVA) and the Sector for Science and Technology (Sektor Wissenschaft und Technik) (SWT), responsible for technological espionage, whose responsibilities were spread across sections. In a sense the Main Directorate was a secret service within the secret service with an autonomy within the Stasi similar to that enjoyed by the First Chief Directorate within the KGB or the Directorate of Operations within the CIA. The HVA had its own budget and its own enterprises, which not only provided cover employment for its operatives, but also contributed finances from their business activities to the upkeep of the service. The Main Directorate also handled its own counterintelligence. This was an exclusive prerogative of the Stasi within the German Democratic Republic, but while the Main Division I handled this mission within the National People's Army and the Border Troops, the Main Division VII handled the Ministry of the Interior and the People's Police, the Main Division XX handled espionage penetration attempts within the GDR's state apparatus and the Main Division II handled counterintelligence among the East German public in general, counterespionage within the HVA was handled exclusively by its organic Division A IX.

Werner Großmann – Deputy Minister and Chief of the HVA (since 1986), Generaloberst (since 1989)

- Work Group S (Arbeitsgruppe S) – internal security within the HVA
- Division A X (Abteilung A X) – Active measures in the Federal Republic of Germany (including West Berlin)
- Division A VII (Abteilung A VII) – analysis and Information
- Division A IX (Abteilung A IX) – penetration of enemy intelligence services in the Federal Republic of Germany and counterintelligence within the HVA

Horst Vogel – First Deputy Chief of the HVA (since 1989) and Chief of the Science and Technology Sector (since 1975), Generalmajor (since 1987)

- Department 5 (Referat 5 / SWT) – the work group of the Deputy Chief of the STS Matthias Warnig
- Work Group 1 / STS (Arbeitsgruppe 1 / SWT) – officer-residents abroad working in line of the STS
- Work Group 3 / STS (Arbeitsgruppe 3 / SWT) – operational acquisition of defence materiel
- Work Group 5 / STS (Arbeitsgruppe 5 / SWT) – exploitation of official channels
- Division A V (STS) (Abteilung A V (SWT)) – analysis for the STS
- Division A VIII (STS) (Abteilung A VIII (SWT)) – operational technology, signals equipment
- Division A XIII (STS) (Abteilung A XIII (SWT)) – fundamental studies
- Division A XIV (STS) (Abteilung A XIV (SWT)) – electronic, optics, digital data processing
- Division A XV (STS) (Abteilung A XV (SWT)) – military technology, mechanical engineering
- Division A XX (STS) (Abteilung A XX (SWT)) – data processing and computing center

Heinz Geyer – Deputy Chief of the HVA (since 1977) and Chief of Staff (since 1982), Generalmajor (since 1985)

- Staff of the HVA (Stab der HVA)
- Work Group XV / BV (Arbeitsgruppe XV / BV) – coordination center for the Divisions XV (the district departments (BezirksVerwaltungen, hence BV) of the Stasi also fielded intelligence departments. They carried the designation Division XV and were coordinated by this work group). Before expanding to the status of an autonomous super-department (the HVA as a whole) the external intelligence department of the Stasi was called Division XV, so the territorial units have retained this designation.
- Division A XVII (Abteilung A XVII) – border closure
- Division A XXI (Abteilung A XXI) – rear services, administration and finances
- Division A VI (Abteilung A VI) – operational travel movement (movement of intelligence officers under the guise of tourism)

Werner Prosetzky – Deputy Chief of the HVA (since 1983), Generalmajor (since 1984)

- Division A III (Abteilung A III) – legal officer-residents in Western countries other than the Federal Republic of Germany
- Division A XIX (Abteilung A XIX) – training and personnel care

Heinrich Tauchert – Deputy Chief of the HVA (since 1987), Generalmajor (since 1989)

- Division A IV (Abteilung A IV) – military intelligence in the Federal Republic of Germany. The Ministry of National Defence had its own intelligence service, which changed its name several times. In its final reiteration before the end of East Germany its official name was the Intelligence Sector (Bereich Aufklärung). The Ministry for State Security also had its own division for military intelligence. Naturally both had West Germany as their main focus. In order to avoid mutual interference they have introduced a separation of their areas of operations. The Intelligence Sector concentrated on the operational side of intel – data about operational plans, manpower and day-to-day operational readiness of the weapons and equipment of the Bundeswehr. The Stasi's (and more precisely the HVA's) Division A IV concentrated on the political and longer term side of intelligence gathering. It operated on military matters in the West German political parties, the Federal Ministry of Defence, the Weaponry Technical Administration (WTD), the administrative departments of the various armed services, research and development establishments, weapons and equipment manufacturers and future weapon acquisitions. Nevertheless, overlapping between the two was not uncommon.
- Division A XI (Abteilung A XI) – Intelligence in North America and US military installations in the Federal Republic of Germany
- Division A XII (Abteilung A XII) – penetration of NATO and the EEC institutions

Ralf-Peter Devaux – Deputy Chief of the HVA (since 1987), Oberst (since 1987)

- Division A I (Abteilung A I) – penetration of the West German state institutions
- Division A II (Abteilung A II) – penetration of the West German political parties and public organisations
- Division A XVI (Abteilung A XVI) – exploitation of official channels, coordination of HVA business enterprises
- Division A XVI (Abteilung A XVIII) – sabotage preparations

Horst Felber – First Secretary of the Socialist Unity Party organs in the Stasi (since 1979), Generalmajor (since 1979)

=== Leadership ===
Sections VII, IX, X and task force S were directly subordinated to the head of the HVA, Colonel General Werner Großmann.

His predecessor was Colonel General Markus Wolf, who led the HVA over 34 years until 1986 and was held in high professional regard in the intelligence community.

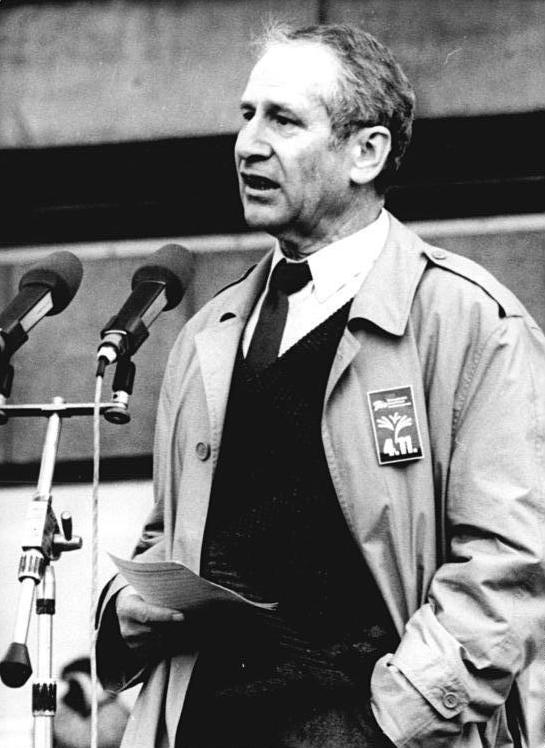
Markus Wolf (November 1989)

The head of the HVA had five deputies. In the last case, these were Major Generals Horst Vogel (1. Deputy), Heinz Geyer (Chief of Staff), Heinrich Tauchert and Werner Prosetzky as well as Colonel Ralf-Peter Devaux.

== Directors ==
- Anton Ackermann (1951–1952)
- Markus Wolf (1952–1986)
- Werner Großmann (1986–1990)

== Recruitment and training ==
Initially, the "HVA College", disguised as the Zentralschule der Gesellschaft für Sport und Technik Edkar André ("Edkar André Main College of the Society for Sports and Vocational Training"), was headquartered in Belzig. Starting in 1965, it was incrementally absorbed into the Juristische Hochschule des MfS (JHS) ("Graduate Law School of the Ministry of State Security"), located in Golm (Potsdam), initially as a vocational training school. From 1968 on, it was called "Fachrichtung für Aufklärung der JHS" ("College of Reconnaissance of the JHS"), and was later renamed to "Sektion A" ("Section A"). The "Fremdsprachenschule des MfS" ("College of Foreign Languages of the Ministry for State Security"), also referred to as "Educational Department F", was attached to it. In 1988, the HVA College, including the College of Foreign Languages, previously located in Dammsmühle bei Mühlenbeck, moved to Lake Seddin in Gosen near the Berlin city limits, approximately 4.5 kilometres (3 miles) south of the city of Erkner. The backup bunker for the headquarters of the HVA was also located there. In 1989 the college had approximately 300 employees and was headed by Lieutenant Bernd Kaufmann. It worked in close cooperation with "Dept. A XIX", and was structured into three Educational Departments:

- Educational Dept. A: Training for political operatives. Dean: Lieutenant Helmut Eck. 4 courses including Marxist–Leninist training, politics, and history.
- Educational Dept. B: "Special Operations" and methodology of service work. Dean: Lieutenant Horst Klugow. 5 courses, including Operative Psychology, Security and Law, as well as foreign residency training.
- Educational Dept. F: College of Foreign Languages. Dean: Lieutenant Manfred Fröhlich. Responsible for the language training for missions abroad, as well as interpreter-training.

== Personnel ==
=== Full time ===
The HVA had more than 3,800 full-time employees in 1989. Among them were, according to the agency's directory, approximately 2,400 professional agents and 700 deputies, 700 unofficial employees, and 670 special agents (Offiziere im besonderen Einsatz). In the course of the HVA's self-disestablishment, the number of employees rose at times above 4,200.

In the autumn of 1989, seven supervisors had a ranking of "general": highest-ranking associate was manager of the HVA, Werner Großmann, as lieutenant general. Four of his deputies, as well as Harry Schütt (chief of counter-espionage) and Otto Ledermann (manager of the SED foundation of the HVA) were Major Generals.

The HVA associates regarded themselves to be the elite of the Ministry of State Security. A high degree of personal engagement, flexibility, performance, and primarily absolute loyalty to the SED was expected of them. Qualified employees of other Stasi departments, such as those with secondary educational degrees, knowledge of foreign languages, etc., could, as a reward for "remarkable achievements", be transferred to the HVA as needed, which was akin to a decoration. On the other hand, HVA personnel could, due to inadequate performance or following an investigation, be transferred to other departments of the Stasi, practically constituting a demotion.

=== Unofficial and other employees ===
The full-time staff of the HVA were complemented by more than 10,000 "unofficial collaborators" or "unofficial employees", the so-called IMs (Inoffizieller Mitarbeiter). These were primarily GDR citizens with permission to travel to the West (the Reisekader; conversely, only a fraction of those with travel permission were IMs), residents of East Germany who were related to "functionally interesting" target persons in the West, couriers and instructors, but also thousands of residents of West Germany and West Berlin, partly in exposed positions in society.

The HVA was particularly interested in recruiting Western students who were visiting the GDR. These were young academics who were suitable for leadership roles and therefore particularly predestined for confidential information; they were developed over decades at a high financial and personnel cost, with the goal of placing them in high positions in the state and the economy, through which they gained access to secret information.

A famous example of such a recruitment operation was Gabriele Gast, who committed herself in 1968 as a student and rose to the rank of Regierungsdirektorin (Government Director) in the Bundesnachrichtendienst (Federal Intelligence Service), the foreign intelligence agency of West Germany. As a high-level source, she was led by Markus Wolf personally.

The actual sources of espionage operations in the West were not necessarily registered as IMs with the HVA (or the Ministry of State Security). In many cases, they were noted as Kontaktpersonen (KP) (contact persons), which reveals little about the degree of cooperation with the intelligence service.

== Headquarters ==
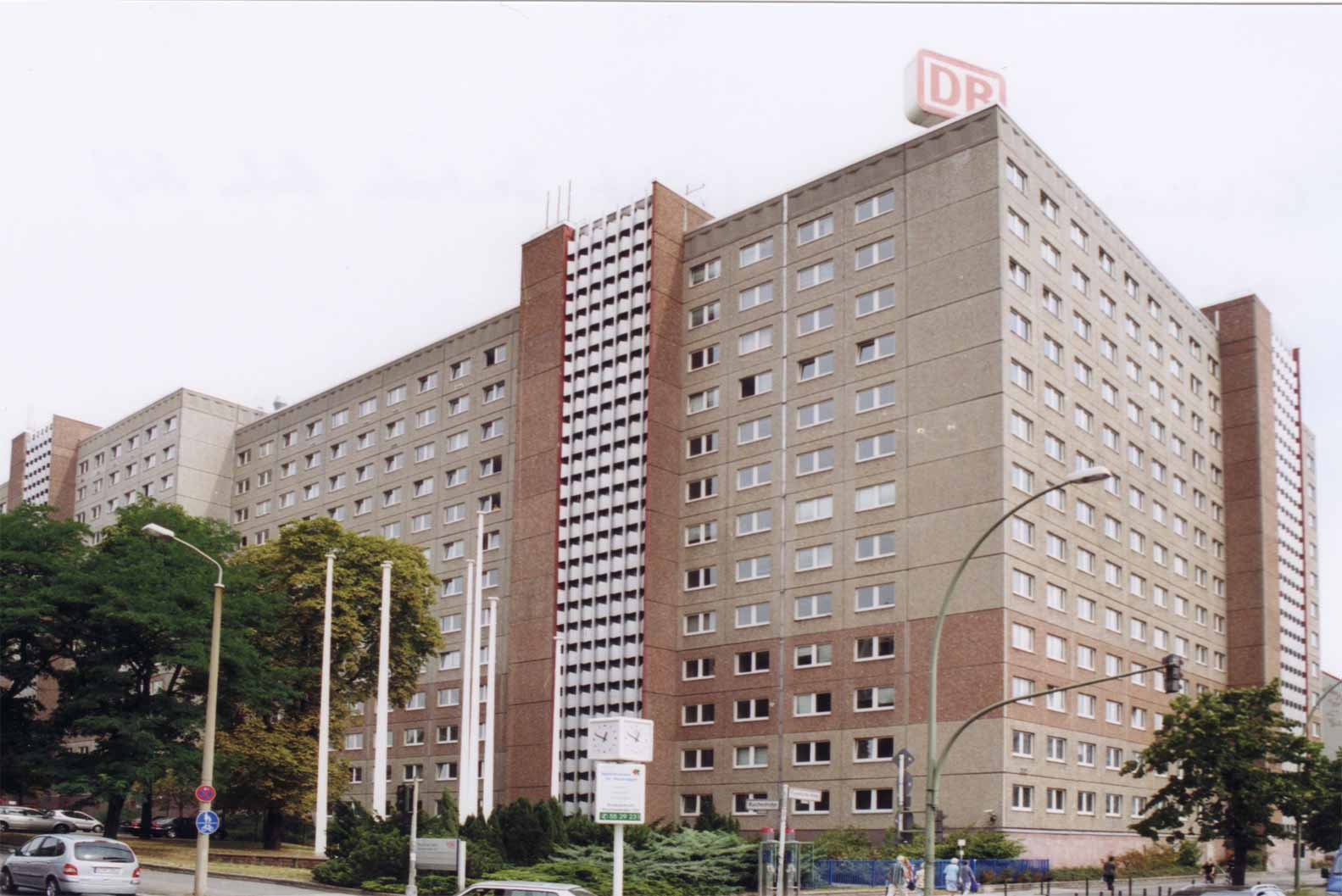
HVA-Berlin

The HVA's predecessor, the APN (Außenpolitischer Nachrichtendienst: Foreign Intelligence Service) resided in the early 1950s first in Pankow, then at the Rolandufer in Mitte, both in Berlin.

The headquarters of the HVA was situated since the mid- to late 1950s in the building complex of the Stasi's headquarters in the Berlin borough of Lichtenberg. After completion of the new office buildings at the corner of Ruschestraße and Frankfurter Allee, the HVA established its base of operations there. (After 1990 an employment agency moved into a building on the site. The building on the Frankfurter Allee is used by Deutsche Bahn. A Deutsche Bahn company logo has been affixed and is easily noticeable.) The Operativ-Technische Sektor (OTS) was located in the Roedernstraße in Hohenschönhausen.

== Budget ==
Former HVA director Markus Wolf asserted in front of a Bundestag committee investigating the activities of the Division of Commercial Coordination (Bereich Kommerzielle Koordinierung or KoKo) that at the end of his tenure (1986) the yearly financial resources of the HVA for operational purposes stood at 17 million East German mark and 13.5 million Deutsche Mark. It was not possible to conclusively refute or verify this statement. In individual HVA sections, there existed "black cash boxes" under the responsibility of the section or department head. Considerably greater amounts were made available for the secret procurement of equipment for section A VIII ("Operational Technology and Radio Communications") and for other recipients in the Stasi, the National People's Army or the East German economy; this money generally came from the Division of Commercial Coordination.

== See also ==
- Rosenholz files
- Susanne Schädlich about BBC radio show "Briefe ohne Unterschrift"
