= Markus Wolf =

East German intelligence service chief (1923–2006)

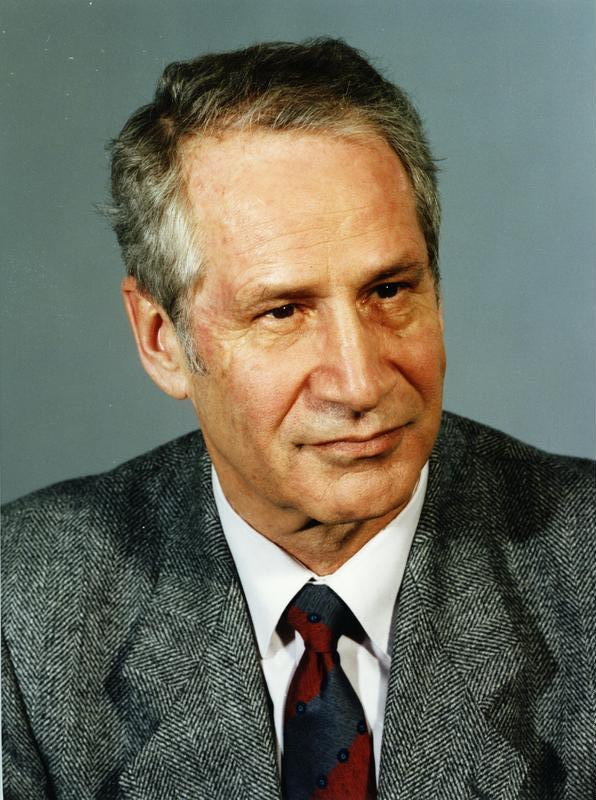
- Wolf in 1989

Director of the Main Directorate for Reconnaissance
- In office 1 December 1952 – 27 November 1986
- Preceded by: Anton Ackermann
- Succeeded by: Werner Großmann

Personal details
- Born: Markus Johannes Wolf; 19 January 1923 Hechingen, Province of Hohenzollern, Weimar Republic
- Died: 9 November 2006 (aged 83) Berlin, Germany
- Resting place: Friedrichsfelde Central Cemetery
- Party: Socialist Unity Party of Germany
- Relations: Konrad Wolf (brother)
- Parent(s): Friedrich Wolf; Else Wolf
- Education: Moscow Aviation Institute
- Nickname: Mischa

Military service
- Allegiance: East Germany
- Branch/service: Main Directorate for Reconnaissance
- Years of service: 1951–1986
- Rank: Colonel General

Markus Johannes Wolf (19 January 1923 – 9 November 2006), also known as Mischa, was a German spymaster who served as the head of the Main Directorate for Reconnaissance (Hauptverwaltung Aufklärung), the foreign intelligence division of East Germany's Ministry for State Security (Ministerium für Staatssicherheit, abbr. MfS, commonly known as the Stasi). He was the Stasi's number two for 34 years, which spanned most of the Cold War. He is often regarded as one of the most effective spymasters during the Cold War. In the West, he was known as the man without a face as Western agencies reportedly did not know what he looked like until 1978.

== Early life and education ==
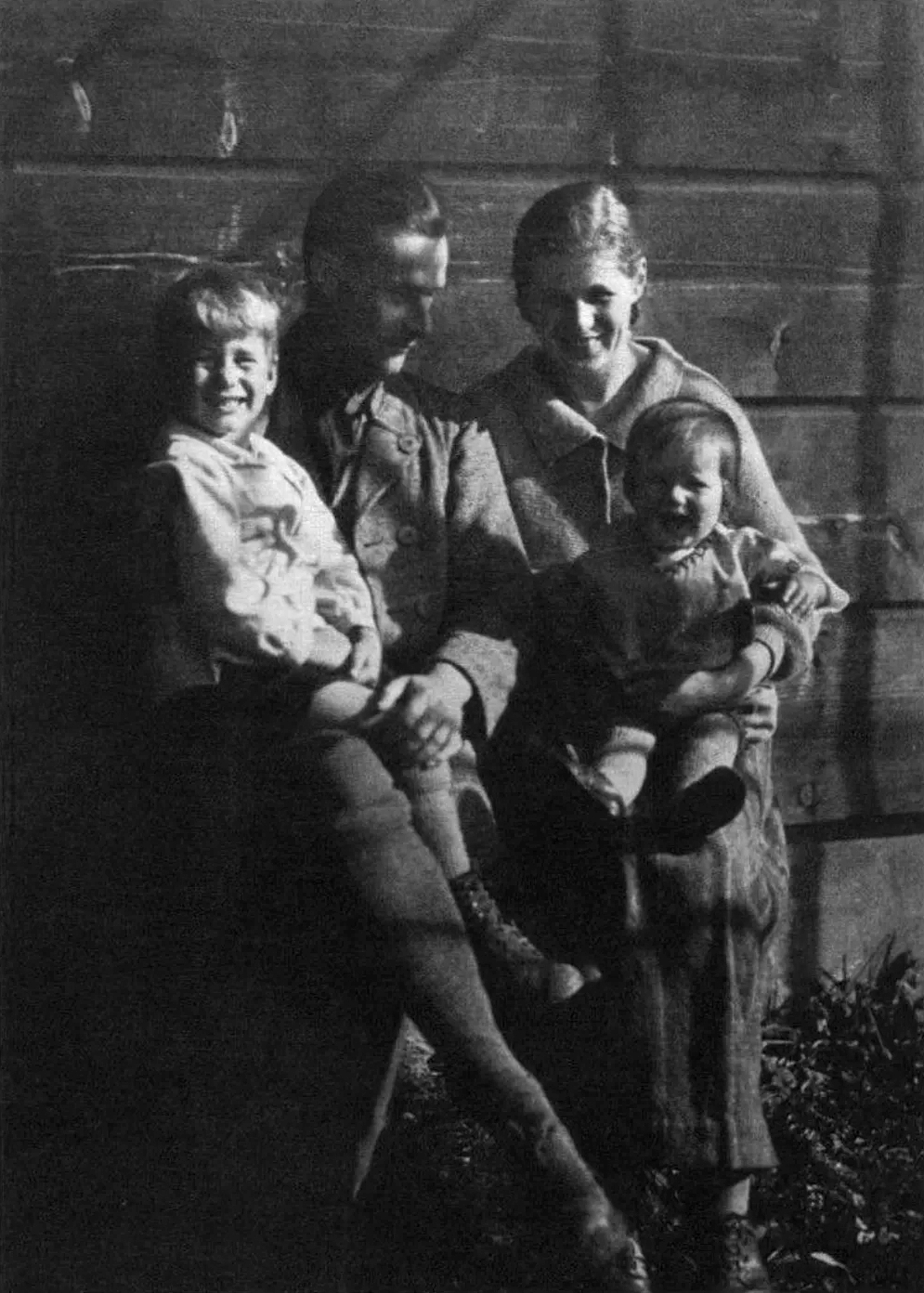
Friedrich Wolf with his wife Else and their sons Markus (left) and Konrad (right), 1926

Wolf was born 19 January 1923, in Hechingen, Province of Hohenzollern (now Baden-Württemberg), to a German-Jewish father and a non-Jewish German mother. His father was the writer, communist activist, and physician Friedrich Wolf and his mother was the nursery teacher Else Wolf (née Dreibholz). He had one brother, the film director Konrad Wolf. His father was a member of the Communist Party of Germany (KPD), and after the anti-communist Nazi Party (NSDAP) gained power in 1933, Wolf emigrated to Moscow with his father, via Switzerland and France, because of their communist convictions and because Wolf's father was Jewish. During his exile, Wolf first attended the German Karl Liebknecht School and later a Russian school. In 1936, at the age of 13, he obtained Soviet identity documents. He was a citizen of Germany, the Soviet Union (USSR), and later East Germany (GDR).

== Career ==
After finishing school, Wolf entered the Moscow Institute of Airplane Engineering (now Moscow Aviation Institute) in 1940, which was evacuated to Alma Ata after Nazi Germany's attack (Operation Barbarossa) on the USSR. There he was told to join the Comintern in 1942, where he among others was prepared for undercover work behind enemy lines. He also worked as a newsreader for German People's Radio after the dissolution of the Comintern, from 1943 until 1945.

After the war, Wolf was sent to Berlin with the Ulbricht Group, led by Walter Ulbricht, to work as a journalist for a radio station in the Soviet occupation zone in Germany. He was among those journalists who observed the entire Nuremberg trials against the principal Nazi leaders. Between 1949 and 1951, Wolf worked at the GDR embassy in the USSR. That same year, he joined the Ministry for State Security (Stasi).

=== HVA and MfS (Stasi) ===
On 1 December 1952, at the age of 29, Wolf was appointed director of the Institute for Economic Research, the foreign intelligence service within the Ministry for State Security, by First Secretary Walter Ulbricht. Succeeding his mentor Anton Ackermann, the agency Wolf headed came to be known as the Main Directorate for Reconnaissance. As intelligence chief, he achieved great success in penetrating the government, political and business circles of West Germany with spies. The most notable individual in this regard was Günter Guillaume, who was secretary to and close friend of West German Chancellor Willy Brandt, and whose exposure as an East German agent in the Guillaume affair led to Brandt's resignation in 1974.

For most of his career in the HVA, Wolf was known as "the man without a face" due to his elusiveness. It was reported that Western agencies did not know the true appearance of the East German spy chief until 1978, when he was photographed by the Säpo, Sweden's National Security Service, during a visit to Stockholm, Sweden. An East German defector, Werner Stiller, then identified Wolf to West German counter-intelligence as the man in the picture. It has also been suggested that elements within the CIA had identified him by 1959 from photographs of attendees at the Nuremberg trials.

=== Support for terrorism ===
Until 1986, Wolf was responsible for Department III, which allegedly supported terrorism in what the GDR considered the non-socialist economic area (German: Nicht-Sozialistische Wirtschaftsgebiet, NSW), which were countries that were not a member of Comecon, especially in the Arab world and had all information about terrorism sent directly to him. Terrorists who received training from Stasi at training camps in the GDR were from countries which were supportive of the GDR including Nicaragua, Angola, Mozambique, Iraq, Syria, Libya, Ethiopia, South Yemen and Palestinians and all of whom stored very large caches of arms and explosives at their embassies in the GDR.

Although the GDR provided direct support to these main countries, the USSR's KGB required Wolf's Stasi to coordinate its efforts with the KGB and beginning in the 1970s they worked together as equals using data from all the Eastern European intelligence services stored at a center in Moscow to unify all the information about international terrorism from all GDR and USSR friendly security services. Wolf's Stasi trained the security brigade of the Palestinian Liberation Organization (PLO) in counterintelligence and briefed PLO trainees about U.S. intelligence services and also protected terrorists from countries allied with the GDR from arrest through the Stasi's monitoring of western intelligence services.

While the Red Army Faction (RAF) conducted terrorism in West Germany, Wolf's Stasi provided safe havens in GDR for the RAF. Wolf's Stasi provided direct training to intelligence services from Nicaragua, Angola, Mozambique, South Yemen and Ethiopia. Although Wolf's Stasi supported the pro-USSR Najibullah from Afghanistan during his stay in the GDR, all Afghan mujahideen organizations in West Germany that operated in Afghanistan during the Soviet Union's War in Afghanistan were infiltrated and high ranking KGB officers controlled operations against mujahideen centers in West Germany because the Soviet intelligence services, including the GRU and the KGB, allegedly considered operations in Afghanistan too sensitive to trust to Wolf's Stasi. Other terrorism related individuals, groups and events that Wolf's Stasi directly supported include:

- Yasser Arafat, who headed the PLO,
- George Habash, who headed the Popular Front for the Liberation of Palestine (PFLP),
- the Venezuelan Illich Ramirez Sanchez, whose code name was "Separat", but was known as "Carlos the Jackal" and often visited East Berlin and the GDR,
- the terrorists involved with the April 1986 La Belle discothèque bombing in West Berlin, and
- Abu Nidal and Abu Daoud, who organized the Munich massacre during September 1972, at the Munich Olympics.

== Retirement ==
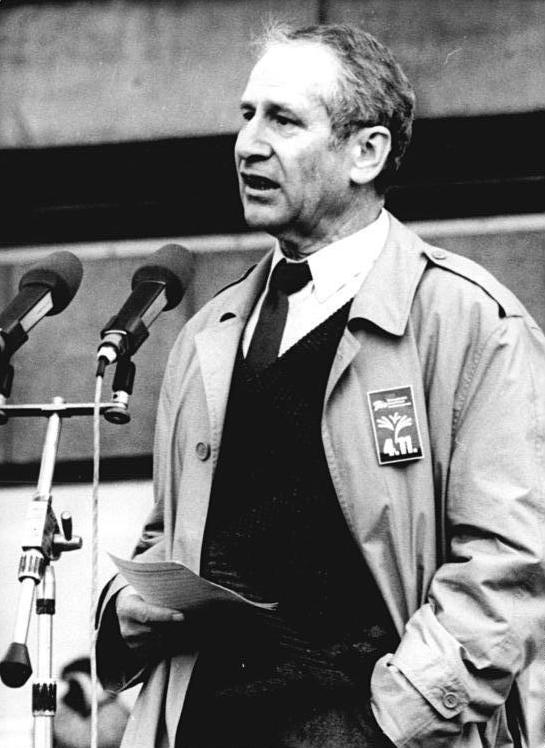
Wolf at the Alexanderplatz demonstration, 4 November 1989

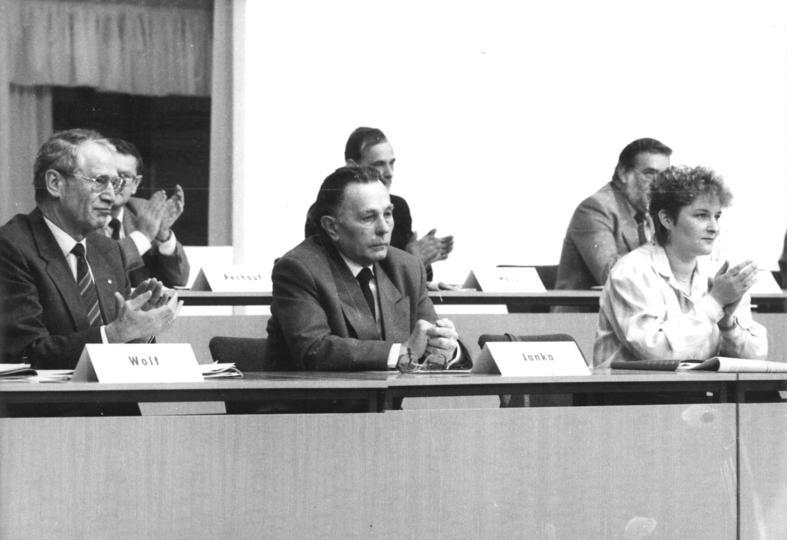
Wolf (first from left) and Walter Janka, December 1989

Wolf retired in 1986 with the rank of Generaloberst, being succeeded by Werner Grossmann as head of the East German foreign intelligence service. He continued the work of his late brother Konrad in writing the story of their upbringing in Moscow in the 1930s. The book Troika came out on the same day in East and West Germanies. During the Peaceful Revolution, Wolf distanced himself from the hardline position taken by Erich Honecker, favouring reform. He spoke at the November 1989 Alexanderplatz demonstration, where he was both booed and applauded by a highly divided crowd during his speech. Calls to "stop" the speech, even to "hang" Wolf could be heard. The dissident Bärbel Bohley would later say:

When I saw that his hands were trembling because the people were booing I said to Jens Reich: We can go now, now it is all over. The revolution is irreversible."

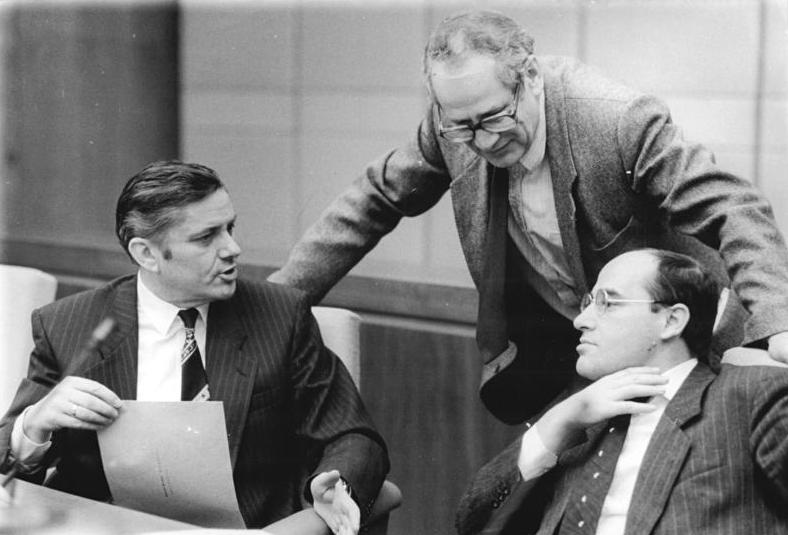
Wolf (center) with SED officials Wolfgang Berghofer (left) and Gregor Gysi (right), January 1990.

In September 1990, shortly before German reunification, Wolf fled the country and sought political asylum in the USSR and Austria. When denied, he returned to West Germany, where he was arrested by West German police. Wolf claimed to have refused an offer of a large amount of money, a new identity with plastic surgery to change his features and a home in California from the Central Intelligence Agency, to defect to the United States.

In 1993, Wolf was convicted of treason by the Oberlandesgericht Düsseldorf and sentenced to six years' imprisonment. This was later quashed by the German supreme court, because West Germany was a separate country at the time. In 1997, he was convicted of unlawful detention, coercion, and bodily harm, and was given a suspended sentence of two years' imprisonment. He was additionally sentenced to three days' imprisonment for refusing to testify against Paul Gerhard Flämig when the former West German (SPD) politician was accused in 1993 of atomic espionage. Wolf said that Flämig was not the agent that he had mentioned in his memoirs.

Wolf died in his sleep at his Berlin home on 9 November 2006. He was cremated and buried in his brother's grave in the Pergolenweg Ehrengrab section of Berlin's Friedrichsfelde Cemetery. In 2011, the State Social Court of Berlin-Brandenburg ruled that his widow Andrea Wolf was not entitled to a "compensation pension" that her husband had been stripped of as a "fighter against fascism".

== Cultural impact ==
John le Carré's fictional spymaster Karla, a Russian, who appears in Tinker, Tailor, Soldier, Spy, The Honourable Schoolboy and Smiley's People was believed by some readers to be modeled on Wolf. However, the writer has repeatedly denied it, and did so once again when interviewed on the occasion of Wolf's death. Le Carré has also stated that it is "sheer nonsense" to claim that Wolf was the inspiration for the character Fiedler in The Spy Who Came in from the Cold. Although Fiedler is a German Jew who spent World War II in exile and then gained a senior position in East Germany's Intelligence Service, Carré said he had no idea who Markus Wolf was at the time of the writing of the book. He added that he considered Wolf to be the moral equivalent of Albert Speer. He maintained that a character's code name Wolf in an early draft of the book was a coincidence and that the name came from the brand of his lawn mower. He renamed the character after being told that there was an actual Wolf in East German intelligence.

Conversely, Wolf stated that The Spy Who Came In From the Cold was the only book he read for a period in the early 1960s, and was surprised how accurately it presented the reality within the East German security services. He wondered if le Carré had had special information about the situation within the Ministry of State Security. Wolf appears as a character in Frederick Forsyth's novel The Deceiver. In the section titled "Pride and Extreme Prejudice", a KGB officer liaises with East German intelligence while tracking down a British agent in East Germany. Forsyth also mentions Wolf in his earlier novel The Fourth Protocol, describing him, and the East German intelligence service as a whole, as masters of the false flag recruitment technique.

== Personal life ==
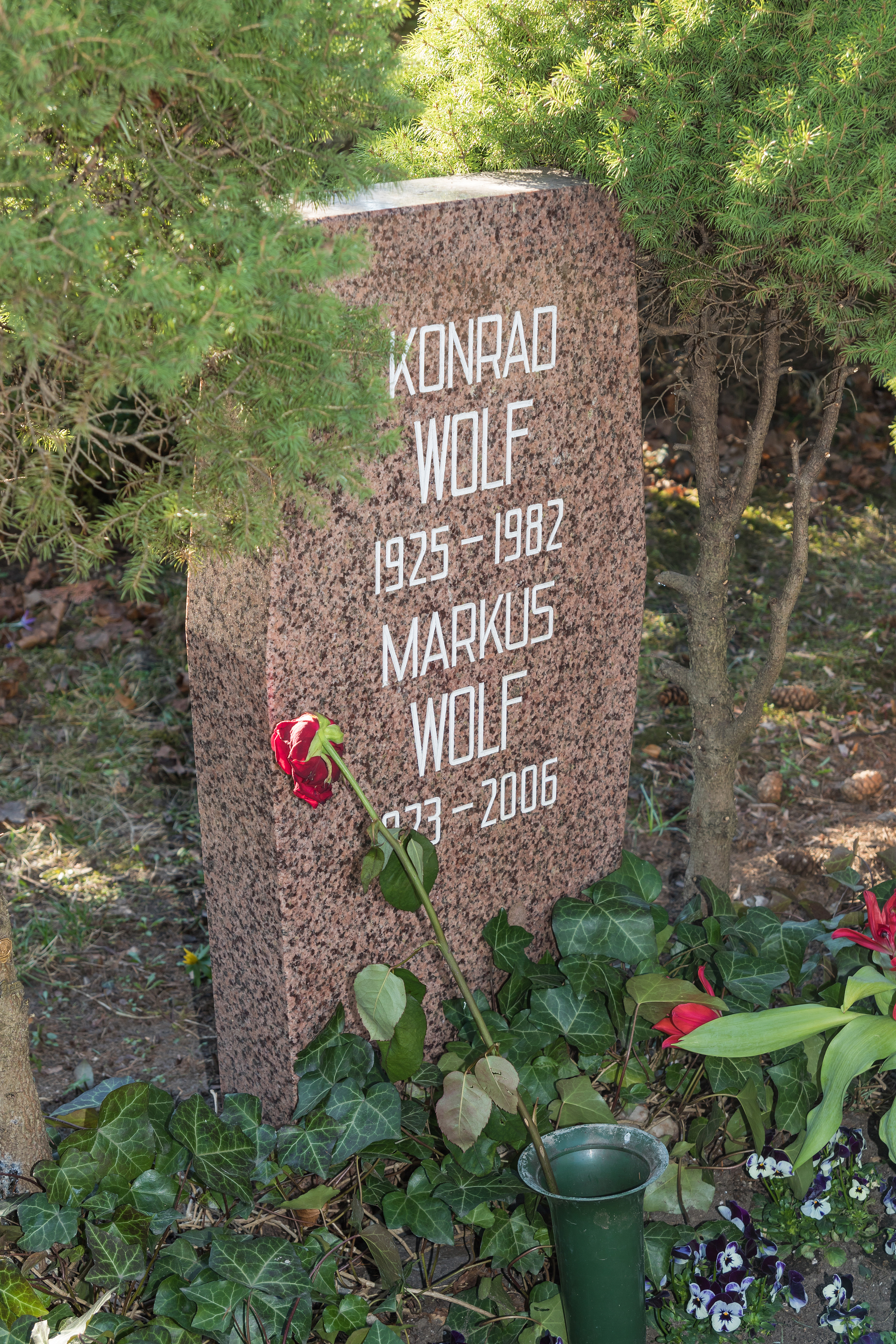
Grave in Zentralfriedhof Friedrichsfelde (Berlin)

Wolf was married three times. In 1944, he married his first wife Emmy Stenzer, the daughter of the German Communist Franz Stenzer, and who was the curator of the archives of Friedrich Wolf, Markus Wolf's father. His second wife was Christa Heinrich and they were married from 1976 to 1986. His third wife was Andrea Stingl and they married in 1986. He had two daughters Tanja Trögel and Claudia Wall and a son Franz Wolf (Manager). Tanja Trögel continued her family passion supporting leftist activities. She is the director of the Friedrich Wolf Memorial in Lehnitz.

Claudia Wall (born in either 1969 or 1970), a step daughter of Markus Wolf, was married from autumn 1997 until late 2008 to Hans Wall, the founder of an outdoor and street furniture firm Wall AG. She had two daughters Elisabeth (born in either 1996 or 1997) from her first marriage and Johanna (b. 1997 or 1998) from her second marriage which was to Hans Wall. Franz Wolf (born in May 1953 in Berlin) is a Gibraltar-based manager of a network of companies owned by Mikhail Fridman.

Government offices
Preceded by Anton Ackermann	Director of the Main Directorate for Reconnaissance; 1 December 1952−27 November 1986	Succeeded by Werner Großmann

== Bibliography ==
- Wolf, Markus (with Anne McElvoy); Memoirs of a Spymaster; Pimlico; ISBN 0712666559; (paperback 1997). Also published under the title Man Without a Face: The Memoirs of a Spymaster (Jonathan Cape, 1997). Wolf wrote six books between 1989 and 2002 including a cookbook titled Geheimnisse der russischen Küche (Secrets of Russian Cuisine), but his memoir is the only one translated into English.
- Dany Kuchel wrote in 2011, The Sword and the Shield, a story of the Stasi in France.
