= Construction soldier =

East German army non-combat role (1964–1990)

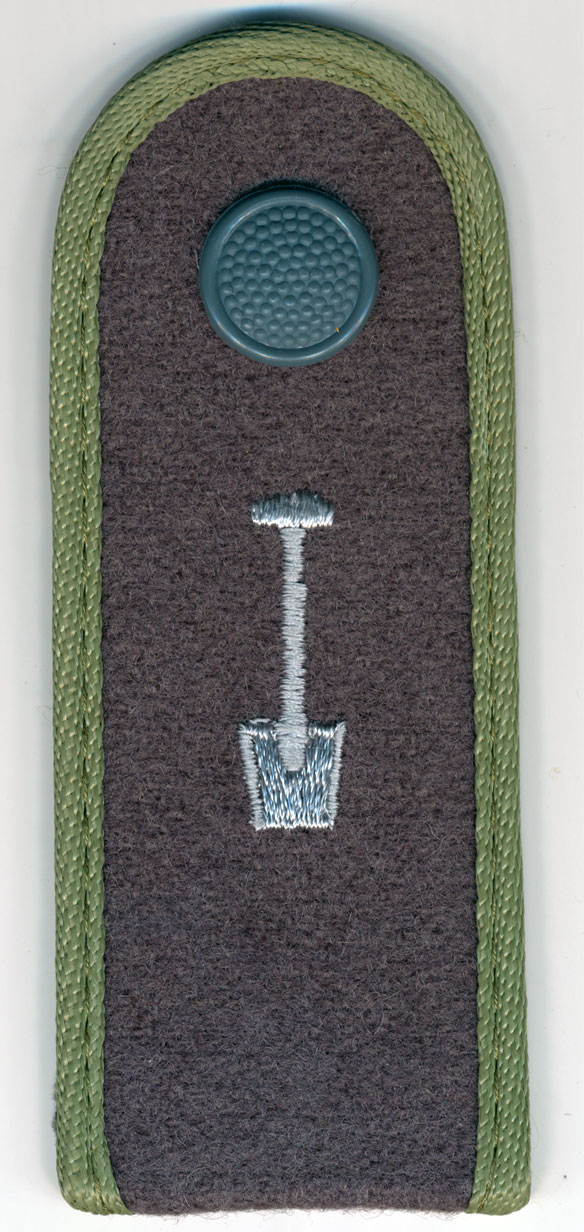
Shoulder piece of a construction soldier

A construction soldier (German: Bausoldat, BS) was a non-combat role of the National People's Army, the armed forces of the German Democratic Republic (East Germany), from 1964 to 1990. Bausoldaten were conscientious objectors who accepted conscription but refused armed service and instead served in unarmed construction units. Bausoldaten were the only legal form of conscientious objection in the Warsaw Pact.

== History ==
=== Background ===
Before the construction of the Berlin Wall in August 1961, military service in the German Democratic Republic (GDR or East Germany) was entirely voluntary, though intensive recruitment drives were mounted by public schools and the Free German Youth, and service was often a prerequisite for future career advancement. The Federal Republic of Germany (West Germany) had introduced conscription in 1956, one year after the Bundeswehr was established, to maximise military strength for the potential World War III during the Cold War. The GDR authorities were reluctant to introduce conscription, partly because they feared that it would increase the already large number of citizens legally migrating to West Germany, known as Republikflucht. However, the Berlin Wall's construction led to a rapid drop in emigration from the GDR (now effectively illegal) with the number decreasing from hundreds of thousands per year to only hundreds per year.

=== Creation ===
On 24 January 1962, East Germany introduced conscription, with all males aged 18 to 60 required to serve 18-months in the National People's Army (NVA). The decision was met by strong resistance from Christian churches in the GDR, who rejected military conscription as there were no alternatives for conscientious objectors who refused armed service on pacifist grounds. When over 1,000 East German men refused mandatory military service and were subsequently arrested in 1962 and 1963, the GDR authorities came under pressure to provide an alternative to armed service. As of 1964 the East German government allowed conscientious objectors to perform their military service in non-combat roles, becoming the only Warsaw Pact country to allow this. The National Defense Council of East Germany authorised the formation of Baueinheiten (construction units) for men of draft age who "refuse military service with weapons on the grounds of religious viewpoints or for similar reasons". The creation of the Baueinheiten was not primarily a victory for East German conscientious objectors, but rather served the interests of the regime in three important respects: it provided a way of dealing with those refusing military service, it responded to the army's infrastructure needs by providing construction labour, and it improved the image of the GDR as respecting citizens' rights to freedom of religion and freedom of conscience.

=== Service conditions ===
The Bausoldaten or "construction soldiers" wore uniforms, lived in barracks under military discipline, and had to serve for the mandatory 18 months like regular soldiers, but were not required to bear arms and received no combat training. They did not swear the same oath as regular soldiers, but were instead required to make a promise of loyalty. They were nicknamed "Spatensoldaten" or "Spati", an abbreviation of the German word for a spade, which was part of their insignia.

Service in the Baueinheiten can be divided into three time periods. The first period, from the beginning of the Baueinheiten in 1964 until approximately 1975, was marked by conflicts as Bausoldaten discovered the military nature of the work they were expected to perform. Complaints and suggestions were addressed to the NVA, to church authorities, as well as to state authorities. In some cases Bausoldaten refused to obey orders and were therefore imprisoned. During the second period, from 1975 to 1982, Bausoldaten were deployed in various military institutions in small groups to perform support services such as gardening, hospital care, and kitchen duties. However, the leadership of the NVA considered these duties to be too light in nature and held them to be responsible for the rise in Bausoldaten numbers. Thus, in the third period, from 1982 to 1989, Bausoldaten were assigned to more physically demanding duties. They were centralized in fewer sites, especially in Prora on the island of Rügen, where they participated in the construction of the Mukran ferry port in Sassnitz, a deployment recognized for difficult working conditions and harsh military discipline. Many Bausoldaten were deployed in civilian industry, especially in large chemical plants, where they were seen as a solution to labour shortages. Despite the NVA's attempts to make service in the Baueinheiten less attractive, the numbers of Bausoldaten continued to rise.

The GDR state authorities mistrusted Bausoldaten, assuming that their motivation was not only religious, but also political, and that they were manipulated by church authority figures. Publicizing the very existence of this service option was avoided. Even the official party newspaper Neues Deutschland mentioned Bausoldaten only five times in its entire history, four of which were in the 1980s. Potential Bausoldaten normally only heard of the Baueinheiten through church circles. Bausoldaten were treated by the army as criminals and enemies of the state, and thus kept away from other soldiers. They were called up at a later age than other conscripts, an certainty that was emotionally difficult for future Bausoldaten, as well as complicating their careers. By the time they were finally called up, many had married and had a child, which the army hoped would make them more compliant. The Stasi (Ministry for State Security) also viewed Bausoldaten with suspicion, especially after they realized that Bausoldaten were often involved in the peace movement and that they often began to organize and resist mistreatment during their service time. The Stasi therefore built dossiers on serving Bausoldaten, although attempts to recruit unofficial collaborators (informers) among them were usually unsuccessful.

Choosing to perform one's military service as a Bausoldat often led to discrimination on top of that already experienced by Christians, especially within the education system, which was part of the system of domination. Although the decision to be a Bausoldat was legal, it was viewed as an attempt to get around from the regime's expectations and was therefore subject to punishment. Even just knowing the difficulties involved discouraged many from attempting to pursue the Abitur qualification and/or higher education in the first place. Admission to university, other than for theological studies, although not expressly forbidden to Bausoldaten or Christians, could require extensive energy and endurance to attain. It was further complicated by the late age at which most Bausoldaten were called up. Military service had to completed before university attendance, yet standard, full-time university studies was not available to those over a certain age. Limitations in career possibilities were also experienced by Bausoldaten.

=== Dissolution ===
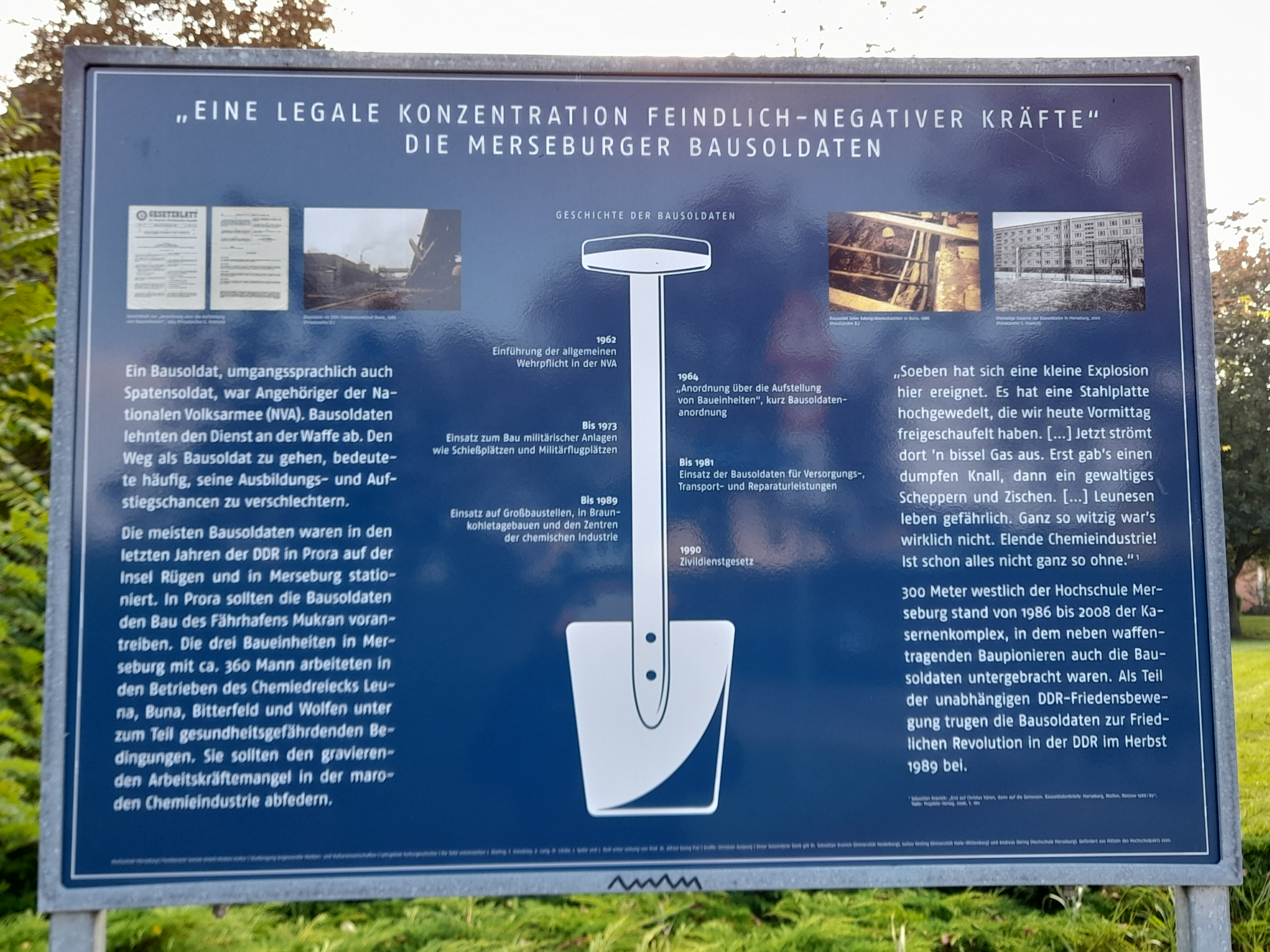
Sign in Merseburg discussing the role of construction soldiers in building the Middle German Chemical Triangle

In the 1980s, the gradual decline of the GDR led to increasing resistance to mandatory military service, even in the Baueinheiten, from the growing pacifist movement and opposition to the ruling Socialist Unity Party of Germany (SED). Many serving Bausoldaten belonged to the opposition movement, while the youth in East Germany began to increasingly demand for an alternative civilian service.

During the Peaceful Revolution pressure to create a true alternative civilian service increased. Already in fall 1989 many serving Bausoldaten were transferred into health care work. On March 1, 1990 a new regulation came into effect, creating a new alternative civilian service completely separate from the army. Approximately 20% of all draftees in 1990 applied for this new civilian service. When German reunification took place in October 1990, the GDR's civilian service came to an end.

== Notable former construction soldiers ==
- Rudolf Albrecht – Protestant minister and representative of the Church's peace movement in the GDR
- Andreas Amende Member of the Bundestag
- Christfried Berger – Protestant theologian in the GDR in the field of ecumenism
- Wolfgang Birthler – veterinarian; Brandenburg State Minister of Agriculture, Environment and Spatial Planning (1999–2004)
- Martin Böttger – physicist, civil rights activist and politician, 1990–1994 Member of the Saxon State Parliament, 2001–2010 Head of the Chemnitz office of the BStU, the federal agency of Germany that preserves and protects the archives and investigates the past actions of the former Stasi
- Harald Bretschneider – Protestant minister and representatives of the ecclesiastical peace, environmental and human rights movement in the GDR
- Stephan Dorgerloh – theologian and politician, Saxony-Anhalt State Minister of Education
- Bernd Eisenfeld – historian and GDR opposition figure
- Rainer Eppelmann – minister and politician (the only Minister of the Ministry of Disarmament and Defense of the GDR)
- Gunter Fritsch – politician; Brandenburg State Minister of Food, Agriculture and Forestry. President of the Brandenburg State Parliament
- Andreas Grapatin – politician, member of the Saxony State Parliament
- Frank Hempel – politician
- Ralf Hirsch – GDR dissident and human rights activist
- Günter Holwas – blues musician
- Johann-Georg Jaeger – politician (Alliance '90 / The Greens), MP
- Karl-August Kamilli – politician, Deputy Chairman of the SPD
- John Kimme – lawyer
- Thomas Kretschmer – civil rights activist and a political prisoner in East Germany
- Hendrik Liersch – publisher of the Corvinus Press
- Heiko Lietz – civil rights activist, former politician (New Forum, Alliance '90 / The Greens)
- Frank-Wolf Matthies – writer
- Gerhard Miesterfeldt – politician, Vice President of the State Parliament of Saxony-Anhalt
- Martin Morgner – poet, playwright and historian
- Andreas Otto – politician (The Greens)
- Bert Papenfuß-Gorek – poet
- Gerd Poppe – physicist, civil rights activist and politician; Human Rights Commissioner of the Federal Government (1998–2003)
- Jürgen Rennert – writer
- Frank Richter – theologian, founder of the Group of 20 in Dresden, director of the Saxon State Agency for Civic Education
- Gerhard Schöne – songwriter
- Reinhard Schult – civil and political activist and leader
- Werner Schulz – civil rights activist and politician, Member of the Bundestag
- Georg Seidel – playwright
- Wolfgang Tiefensee – 1998–2005 Lord Mayor of Leipzig; 2005–2009 Federal Minister of Transport, Building and Urban Development
- Mathias Tietke – journalist, author, right-wing extremist
- Rudolf Tschäpe – astrophysicist and civil rights activist
- Nicholas Voss – political official
- Gunter Weißgerber – politician
- Ingo Zimmermann – journalist and art historian

== See also ==
- Conscientious objection in East Germany
- Reich Labour Service
