= Matthias Hartmann =

German professor of business administration (1965–2020)

Matthias Herbert Hartmann
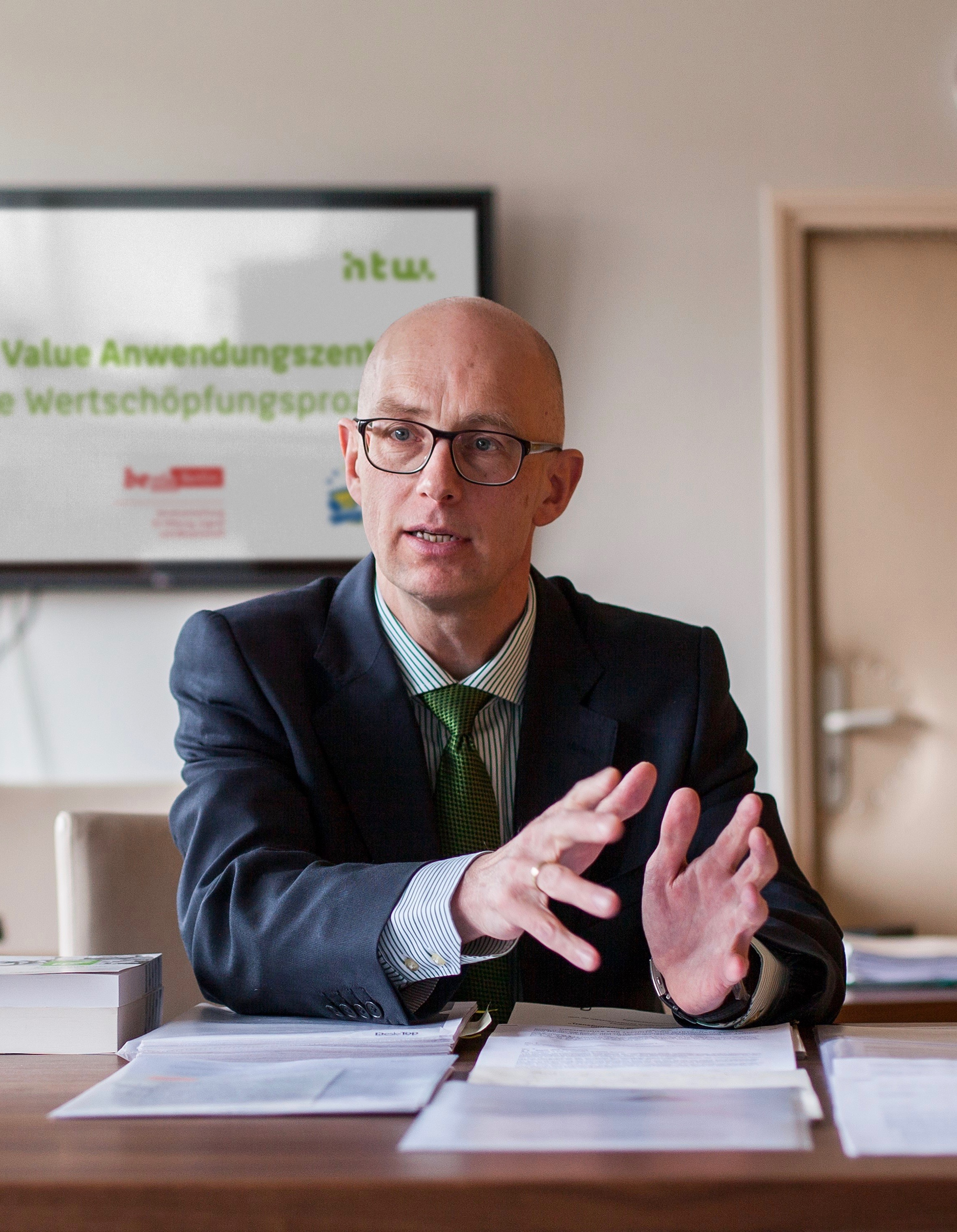
- Hartmann in 2016
- Born: 21 March 1965; Berlin, Germany
- Died: 26 August 2020 (aged 55)

Academic background
- Education: University of Erlangen–Nuremberg
- Doctoral advisor: Werner Pfeiffer

Matthias Herbert Hartmann (21 March 1965 – 26 August 2020) was a German professor of business administration and the dean of the Department of Economics and Law at the Hochschule für Technik und Wirtschaft Berlin (HTW – University of Applied Sciences). As an expert for innovation and technology management, he worked as a business consultant. In his function as staff officer of the reserves, he was a consultant in Germany's Federal Ministry of Defense.

== Life ==
Matthias H. Hartmann grew up in Berlin's Wilmersdorf district. He attended college-prep high school in Bavaria: from 1975 to 1984 at the Dominicus von Linprun Gymnasium in Viechtach.In 1984, he became a reserve officer in Germany's armed forces, the Bundeswehr; trained as a combat and airborne engineer, later became a consultant for strategy and operations in the Federal Ministry of Defense; and finally, as Colonel of the Reserves, he served until his death as Department Head of the Bundeswehr's Operations Command in Potsdam.

From 1986 to 1991, he studied Business Administration at the University of Erlangen-Nuremberg, majoring in Business Informatics, Industrial Management, and Accounting and graduated with a Diploma in Business Administration. As Business Manager at the chair for Industrial Management of the University of Erlangen-Nuremberg from 1992 to 1997, he was a doctoral candidate under Werner Pfeiffer, completing his doctorate with the title of Dr. rer. pol.

Hartmann realized early that all successful activity requires both an adequate theoretical foundation and an understanding of practical implementation. This combination of theory and practice was the basis of his activity in all areas, whether academic instruction, company management, or the athletic challenges of volleyball, underwater rugby, skydiving, or triathlon, in which he repeatedly completed an Ironman. He displayed his particular way of thinking and acting especially as an officer of the Bundeswehr, most recently as a staff officer holding the rank of Colonel of the Reserve within the Military engineers

He steadily continued developing his principles of operation in practical activities, for example from 1997 to 2000 in the management consulting firm A.T. Kearney as Senior Manager, until 2020 as Business Manager of the management consulting firm Takticum Consulting GmbH, and in the course of his military service. Precisely implementing the principles of military leadership doctrine in combination with his practical experience as a leader of soldiers and with aspects of employee motivation and successful company strategies shaped his way of thinking and operating.

== Academic work ==
Hartmann was appointed Professor of Production & Logistics at the Hochschule für Technik und Wirtschaft Berlin (HTW – University of Applied Sciences) in October 2000 and held the position until 2020. His emphases – digitalization and Industry 4.0 – lay within the fields of production and logistics management, information management, and innovation and technology management. From 2015 to 2017, he was dean of the Department of Economics and Law at the HTW Berlin, whose orientation he decisively shaped by appointing nine professors. From 2018 to 2020, he was a member of the Board of Trustees of the HTW Berlin. In this function, he was responsible for supervising the university. Beyond that, since 2016, he headed the Digital Value Application Center, which is supported by the European Fund for Regional Development and in which he fostered small and mid-sized companies from Berlin in their efforts to digitalize. Especially such companies without research capacities of their own profit from the center's knowledge resources and interdisciplinary research teams, as Prof. Hartmann's support project Digital Entrepreneurship shows. What digitalization can mean for Berlin as a site for startups, for the people who live and work there, and for its visitors from all over the world was discussed at, for example, the event MittendrIn Berlin! (in the middle of Berlin).[6]

His academic work was characterized by research guided by theory and strongly oriented toward practice and by system-theoretical influences like those of Niklas Luhmann and the epistemological and theory-of-science considerations of Karl Popper. In the studies under Werner Pfeiffer, Professor for Industrial and Retail Management, that shaped him, he consistently applied these ideas to business management issues like system rationalization and system economic efficiency, which ultimately provided the canon of his work in technology and innovation management. As a result, Matthias H. Hartmann worked out a form of technological accounting with which he earned his doctorate in 1996.

In the following years, he published articles on technological accounting, company management, determining technological potential, and technological cost-analysis. He also wrote articles on the reporting systems of technological companies. He thereby answered questions on how financial control systems can be used for reporting systems, how new digital technologies can influence reporting systems, and how new digital technologies affect the company system. His focus thereby was on the effect of technologies on the managing system or governance of companies. He published systems-theoretical articles on business models, IT security, and sustainability. Beyond that, he published empirical articles on the factors of success in the digital transformation of small and mid-sized companies.

== Selected publications ==
=== Monographs ===
- Technologie-Bilanzierung, Instrument einer zukunftsorientierten Unternehmensbeurteilung. Vandenhoeck & Ruprecht, Göttingen 1997, ISBN 3-525-12575-5.
- Berichtswesen für High-Tech-Unternehmen: Reporting mit Balanced Scorecard, web-basierten Systemen und Beteiligungsmanagement. Erich Schmidt Verlag, Berlin 2004, ISBN 3-503-07832-0.
- Internationale E-Discovery und Information Governance. Erich Schmidt Verlag, Berlin 2011, ISBN 978-3-503-13074-0.
- IT-Sicherheit für Handwerk und Mittelstand. Empfehlungen zur Digitalisierung. BWV Berliner Wissenschafts-Verlag, Berlin 2017, ISBN 978-3-8305-3820-2.
- Impulse für digitale Lösungen. Empfehlungen für Kleine und Mittlere Unternehmen. BWV, Berlin 2018, ISBN 978-3-8305-3901-8.
- Digitale Transformation von KMU. Von der Strategie bis zum Werkzeug. BWV, Berlin 2019, ISBN 978-3-8305-3904-9.
- Digital Excellence in KMU. 11 Pilotprojekte und Best Practices zur Digitalisierung. BWV, Berlin 2020, ISBN 978-3-8305-4220-9.

=== Editorship ===
- with Olaf Kracker, Frank Behr and Björn-Ulrik Bluschke (ed.): Zukunftspotentiale des E-Manufacturing. Empirical market study. Berlin 2003.
- with Wilhelm Schmeisser, Hermann Mohnkopf and Gerhard Metze (ed.): Innovation Performance Accounting. Financing Decisions and Risk Assessment of Innovation Processes. Springer, Berlin/ Heidelberg 2009, ISBN 978-3-642-01352-2.
- with Wilhelm Schmeisser, Dieter Krimphove and Claudia Hentschel (ed.): Handbuch Innovationsmanagement. UVK Verlag, Konstanz/Munich 2013, ISBN 978-3-86764-421-1.
- with Wilhelm Schmeisser, Wolfgang Becker, Markus Beckmann, Alexander Brem, Peter Eckstein (ed.): Neue Betriebswirtschaft. Munich 2018, ISBN 978-3-86764-828-8. (2nd revised edition, Munich 2020, ISBN 978-3-8252-5327-1)

=== Journal articles ===
- with Werner Pfeiffer and Enno Weiß: Die "Ford-Psychose" nicht wiederholen. Part 1. In: Blick durch die Wirtschaft. Ed. by Frankfurter Allgemeine Zeitung, 18 March 1993, ISSN 0406-4224, S. 5; and Die "Ford-Psychose" nicht wiederholen. Part 2. In: Blick durch die Wirtschaft. 19 March 1993, ISSN 0406-4224, p. 5.
- with Thomas Mild und Alexander Sasse: Technologiekostenanalyse als Instrument des Innovationskostenmanagements. In: krp. Kostenrechnungspraxis. Zeitschrift für Controlling. Vol. 41, No. 6, 1997, ISSN 0931-9077, p. 312–318.
- with Friedwart Lender: Chipkartenunternehmen im Umbruch. In: Card-Forum. 3/1997, ISSN 1437-2207, p. 65–70.
- mit Friedwart Lender: Assessing Take-Over Opportunities. In: Card Forum International. 4/1997, S. 42–46.
- Die Technologiebilanz als Instrument einer zukunftsorientierten Unternehmensbeurteilung. In: WiSt. Wirtschaftswissenschaftliches Studium. Vol. 27, No. 3, 1998, ISSN 0340-1650, p. 134–136.
- with Thomas Mild und Alexander Sasse: Innovationen besser managen mit Hilfe der Technologiekostenanalyse. In: Blick durch die Wirtschaft. 19 June 1998, ISSN 0406-4224, p. 5.
- Theorie und Praxis technologischer Unternehmensbeurteilung. In: Zeitschrift für Betriebswirtschaft. No. 9, 1998, ISSN 0044-2372, p. 1009–1027.
- Due Diligence bei High-Tech-Unternehmen. In: DSWR. Datenverarbeitung, Steuer, Wirtschaft, Recht. No. 11, 1998, ISSN 0341-5449, p. 305–308.
- Theory and practice of technological corporate assessment. In: International Journal of Technology Management. Vol. 17, No. 4, 1999, ISSN 0267-5730, p. 504–521.
- Qualitätscontrolling in der Forschung und Entwicklung. In: krp. Kostenrechnungspraxis. Zeitschrift für Controlling. 2000, ISSN 0931-9077, p. 89–99.
- Web-based Controlling für das Innovationsmanagement. In: krp. Kostenrechnungspraxis. Zeitschrift für Controlling. Special issue, 2001, ISSN 0931-9077, p. 81–85.
- with Hans-Jürgen Müller and Dirk Buchta: ERP-Collaboration mit Marktplätzen durch EAI. In: Information Management. 1/2001, ISSN 1616-1017, p. 24–31.
- with Jörn Kriegel and Jürgen Venhofen: E-Discovery mit der IKB Data GmbH. IT-Governance-Services bei juristischen Fragen. In: IT-Governance. 2010, ISSN 1864-6557, p. 16–20.
- with Bastian Halecker: Contribution of systems thinking to business model research and business model innovation. In: International Journal of Technology Intelligence and Planning. Vol. 9, No. 4, 2013, ISSN 1740-2840, p. 251–270.
- Bastian Halecker, Katharina Hölzle, Matthias Hartmann: Konzeptrahmen zur systemwirtschaftlichen Bewertung von Geschäftsmodellalternativen. In: Zeitschrift für KMU und Entrepreneurship. (ZfKE), 64(2016)2, ISSN 1860-4633 (Print) / ISSN 1865-5114 (Online), p. 149–156.

=== Contributions to anthologies ===
- Wissensmanagement mit der Technologiebilanz. In: Enno Weiß (Ed.): Innovative Unternehmensführung: Festgabe zum 65. Geburtstag von Professor Dr. Werner Pfeiffer. Research and Consulting Group for Innovative Corporate Management, Nuremberg 1998, ISBN 3-00-003617-2, p. 101–118.
- with Thomas Mild: Die Technologiebilanz als neuer Ansatz des strategischen Controlling. In: Andreas Borszcz, Sven Piechota (Ed.): Controlling-Praxis erfolgreicher Unternehmen. Gabler, Wiesbaden 1998, ISBN 3-409-18891-6, S. 267–281.
- Web-based Controlling für das Innovationsmanagement. In: Wolfgang Männel (Ed.): Kongress Controlling und Kostenmanagement 2000. Verlag der GAB, Gesellschaft für Angewandte Betriebswirtschaft, Lauf an der Pegnitz 2000, p. 93–102.
- Bestimmung des technologischen Potentials für einen Chipkartenbetrieb. In: Friedwart Lender (Ed.): Innovative betriebswirtschaftliche Lösungen für und mit Chipkarten: Ergebnisse des betriebswirtschaftlichen Kolloquiums an der Fachhochschule Hof. 2nd edition. Fachhochschule Hof, Hof 2001, ISBN 3-935565-00-3, p. 51–69.
- Web-basiertes Controlling mit Projektportal. In: Franz Arnold (Ed.): Handbuch der Telekommunikation. Supplement to the loose-leaf edition. Fachverlag Deutscher Wirtschaftsdienst, Cologne 2002, ISBN 3-87156-096-0, p. 86.
- Web-basiertes (Personal-)Controlling mit Projektportal. In: Wilhelm Schmeisser, Jan Grothe, Thomas R. Hummel (Ed.): Internationales Personalcontrolling und internationale Personalinformationssysteme. Reihe: Schriften zum Internationalen Management. Herausgegeben von Thomas R. Hummel. Edition Rainer Hampp, Munich 2003, ISBN 3-87988-761-6, p. 57–67.
- with Bastian Halecker: How can Systems Thinking add Value to Business Model Innovation. In: K. R. E. Huizingh, S. Conn, M. Torkkeli, S. Schneider, I. Bitran (Ed.): Proceedings of the XXIV ISPIM Conference – Innovating in Global Markets: Challenges for Sustainable Growth. ISPIM, Helsinki 2013, ISBN 978-952-265-421-2.
- Information Governance in Big Data. In: Matthias Knaut (Ed.): Zukunft Wirtschaft. Beiträge und Positionen 2013. Reihe: Schriften der Hochschule für Technik und Wirtschaft Berlin. BWV Berliner Wissenschafts-Verlag, Berlin 2013, ISBN 978-3-8305-3189-0, p. 146–152.
- with Bastian Halecker: Das Geschäftsmodell als Strategic Deployment im strategischen Denken. In: Daniel R. A. Schallmo (Ed.): Kompendium Geschäftsmodell-Innovation. Grundlagen, aktuelle Ansätze und Fallbeispiele zur erfolgreichen Geschäftsmodell-Innovation. Springer Gabler, Wiesbaden 2014, ISBN 978-3-658-04458-9, p. 209–232.
- with Bastian Halecker: Management of Innovation in the Industrial Internet of Things. In: Proceedings of the XXVI ISPIM Conference – Shaping the Frontiers of Innovation Management. ISPIM, Budapest 2015, ISBN 978-952-265-779-4.
- with Bastian Halecker: Management-Prinzipien in der Industrie 4.0. In: Stephan Schäfer, Carsten Pinnow (Ed.): Industrie 4.0 – Grundlagen und Anwendungen. Branchentreff der Berliner Wissenschaft und Industrie. Beuth Verlag, Berlin 2015, ISBN 978-3-410-25780-8, p. 233–244.
- with Bastian Halecker: Nachhaltige Mobilität im digitalen Zeitalter. In: HTW Berlin, Matthias Knaut (Ed.): Nachhaltige Mobilität, Energiewende und Industrie 4.0. Series: Beiträge und Positionen der HTW Berlin. Vol. 5. BWV-Verlag, Berlin 2015, ISBN 978-3-8305-3575-1, p. 168–176.
- with Bastian Halecker: Digitale Revolution im Management. In: HTW Berlin, Matthias Knaut (Ed.): Digitalisierung: Menschen zählen. Series: Beiträge und Positionen der HTW Berlin. BWV-Verlag, Berlin 2016, ISBN 978-3-8305-3700-7, p. 44–51.
- with Bastian Halecker: Pragmatische Cyber Security in Kritischen Infrastrukturen – zwei Fallbeispiele. In: Stefan Schäfer, Carsten Pinnow (Ed.): Industrie 4.0. Safety und Security – Mit Sicherheit gut vernetzt. Branchentreff der Berliner und Brandenburger Wissenschaft und Industrie. Beuth Verlag, Berlin 2017, ISBN 978-3-410-26406-4, p. 57–68.
- with Bastian Halecker und Ralf Waubke: Appleism & Googleism als neuer Managementansatz in der Industrie von morgen. In: HTW Berlin, Matthias Knaut (Ed.): Industrie von morgen. Beiträge und Positionen 2017. BWV-Verlag, Berlin 2017, ISBN 978-3-8305-3767-0, p. 50–57.
- Systemtheorie in der Betriebswirtschaft. In: Anshuman Khare, Dagmar Kessler, Jan Wirsam (Ed.): Marktorientiertes Produkt- und Produktionsmanagement in digitalen Umwelten. Festgabe für Klaus Bellmann zum 75. Geburtstag. Springer Gabler, Wiesbaden 2018, ISBN 978-3-658-21637-5, p. 61–73.
- with Oliver Kullik, Katharina Hölzle and Bastian Halecker: Company Building – A New Phenomenon of Corporate Venturing? In: I. Bitran, Steffen Conn, Eelko Huizingh, Olga Kokshagina, M. Torkkeli, Marcus Tynnhammar (Ed.): Proceedings of the XXIX ISPIM Innovation Conference: Innovation, The Name of the Game. ISPIM, Stockholm 2018, ISBN 978-952-335-218-6.
- Produktivitätsgrenzen der Digitalen Transformation. In: HTW Berlin, Stefanie Molthagen-Schnöring (Ed.): Grenzen in Zeiten technologischer und sozialer Disruption. Series: Beiträge und Positionen der HTW Berlin. Vol. 9. BWV-Verlag, Berlin 2019, ISBN 978-3-8305-3957-5, p. 34–40.
- with Leonhard Gebhardt und Ralf Waubke: Empirische Erfahrungen zum Digital Entrepreneurship in KMU. In: Katharina Hölzle, Heike Surrey, Victor Tiberius (Ed.): Perspektiven des Entrepreneurships. Unternehmerische Konzepte zwischen Theorie und Praxis. Schäffer-Poeschel Verlag, Stuttgart 2020, ISBN 978-3-7910-4471-2, p. 34–40.
- with Ralf Waubke und Leonhard Gebhardt: Productivity Paradox in Digital Innovation for SMEs. In: Daniel R. A. Schallmo, Joseph Tidd (Hrsg.): Digitalization. Digitalization: Approaches, Case Studies, and Tools for Strategy, Transformation and Implementation. Reihe: Management for Professionals. Springer Nature, Cham 2021, doi:10.1007/978-3-030-69380-0 9, ISBN 978-3-030-69379-4, p. 145–152.
