= Thomas Kretschmer (artist) =

- Born: 18 December 1955 (age 70); Dornburg, Bezirk Gera, East Germany
- Occupations: Artist, Christian civil rights activist, pacifist
- Spouse: Y
- Children: 4

Thomas Kretschmer (born 18 December 1955) is a German self-taught artist, specialising in carved wood "picture-images" (Bildschnitzer).

Before and during 1989 he was a Christian civil rights activist and pacifist who received disproportionate attention from the security services over many years. At various points between 1973 and 1985 he was held as a political prisoner in the German Democratic Republic.

== Life ==
Kretschmer was born in Dornburg, a small hilltop town some 12 km (7 miles) northeast of Jena. His father was a biologist: his mother was an education specialist. He grew up in a Catholic family and in 1970, at the age of 14 refused to participate in a Jugendweihe, a secular "coming of age" ceremony which in the German Democratic Republic had some of the features of a church confirmation. He started a professional trade apprenticeship in 1970, but was excluded from further training or schooling in 1972 after he left the Young Communists (FDJ / Freie Deutsche Jugend) and announced his refusal to undertake military service with the National People's Army: the German Democratic Republic made no accommodation for Conscientious objectors. At the end of a turbulent year he was able to start a new traineeship, as a care assistant at the city hospital in Jena.

In June 1973 Kretschmer, still aged only 17, attempted to escape from East Germany, "in order to avoid military service" ("um sich dem Wehrdienst zu entziehen"). Human losses during World War II, exacerbated by a steady stream of migration to the west during the 1950s, had left the country desperately short of working age population, and after 1961 there were effective measures in place to prohibit and prevent emigration. Kretschmer hitchhiked via Dresden to the border with Czechoslovakia which he was able to cross, and continued on his way towards Austria. However, 500 meters short of the border dividing Czechoslovakia from Austria he was caught by Czechoslovak soldiers, blindfolded, placed on the back seat of a jeep like vehicle next to a large dog whose noisy panting and odour he would remember long afterwards, and returned to the German Democratic Republic. The district court in Jena sentenced him to a fifteen-month jail term for attempting illegal emigration. During his incarceration in the Ichtershausen Youth Correction Facility he was repeatedly interrogated and pressured by officers from the Ministry for State Security. Kretschmer was persuaded to sign a declaration in which he undertook to collaborate with Stasi. Kretschmer had been identified as a committed Catholic with good contacts among the youth community: he had told his interrogators that he wanted to become a priest. He appears in Stasi records as "Agent Kaplain", along with a note by his handler that he was of "above average intelligence". Unusually, however, he had a change of heart a few days after his recruitment and wrote to his handler withdrawing the undertaking to collaborate. He was nevertheless released in 1974 at the end of his fifteen-month sentence. The Stasi continued, without success, to try and persuade him to collaborate with them.

From 1974 Kretschmer engaged actively in evangelical youth work in Jena. Between 1974 and 1976 he worked as a care assistant at the city hospital in Jena, and in a residential institution for the handicapped at the nearby health resort of Bad Blankenburg, while also remaining active in the local "alternative youth scene". In 1976 he began to study for the priesthood at the Erfurt priest seminary. He then married and relocated to nearby Apfelstädt. In 1980 he was prevented from undertaking further studies for the priesthood by the official church in Thuringia. Other sources state that he had already, in 1979, withdrawn for personal reasons. In either case, in November 1980 he again found himself summoned to perform his military service and, when he refused the call, arrested. In December 1980 his conscription was conditionally suspended and he was instead called up to serve as a Construction soldier ("Bausoldat").

The new Construction soldier ("Bausoldat") system provided the state with a solution to the challenge presented by Conscientious objection, but it also offered a de facto finishing school for principled activists and pacifists. Kretschmer developed an affinity with the Solidarity Movement in neighbouring Poland, and demonstrated his support at the start of 1982 with a New Year's Batik which he designed, created, and distributed to his friends. It displayed the brief but, in the context of the times, politically powerful injunction, "Learn Polish!" ("Lernt polnisch!"). His seasonal greeting was intercepted by the censors and he was arrested in January 1982, spending the next six months being looked after by the Ministry for State Security at their Main Interrogation Centre in Berlin.

In August 1982 a military high court in Halle condemned Kretschmer under sections §214, §245 and §246 of the criminal code for "activity affecting the state" and "public disrespect". He was sentenced to four and a half years in prison, some of which he would spend in the country's only military prison, at Schwendt. Later it became known that Kretschmer's defence attorney for this trial was a Stasi collaborator who had been providing reports on his client to the Ministry. At the time of Kretschmer's imprisonment in the Schwedt Military Prison his wife and four young children were unprovided for. He was one of several inmates at the establishment who came to the attention of the international London-based human rights organisation, Amnesty International: they sent his wife an hundred British pounds for the family's basic living costs.

In January 1985 Kretschmer was transferred to the Stasi detention centre at Karl-Marx-Stadt (as Chemnitz was then called) in preparation for his release to West Germany. Kretschmer refused to go to West Germany. His case was taken up by Archbishop Kurt Scharf, Bishop Werner Leich, and by church organisations more generally, along with Amnesty International who nominated him their "prisoner of the year". In July 1985 Kretschmer, who had by this time been transferred to Leipzig, was released. He now worked, till 1989, as a church manual craftsman in Ebersdorf.

The fall of the Berlin Wall in November 1989, and the ensuing evidence that Mikhail Gorbachev had issued no orders to the military for the violent suppression of the burgeoning revolution, opened the way for a succession of events that would lead to the demise, as a standalone one-party dictatorship of the German Democratic Republic and, in October 1990, German reunification. In regional Stasi establishments across the country one feature of the Peaceful revolution was a desperate scramble to destroy the paper records that the Stasi had built up and safeguarded during nearly four decades. Protestors rushed across the country to prevent the destruction of the Stasi records, with varying degrees of success. Kretsschmer participated in the occupation of the Stasi regional office at the town of Bad Lobenstein and he was a member of the Thuringian Citizens' Committee for Resolving Stasi issues ("thüringischen Bürgerkomitee zur Auflösung des MfS"). He participated in local politics as a member of the Bad Lobenstein "Ecclesiastical Electorate Community" ("Kirchliche Wählergemeinschaft").

As of 2015, Krestschmer lives quietly as a wood carver in Tegau. He also worked from 2001 in a specialist clinic in Stadtroda with physically handicapped patients.

In 2014 his civil resistance record was honoured in a Stasi Records Agency exhibition at the Heinrich Böll Foundation.
