= Thomas Kretschmer =

Thomas Kretschmer may refer to:

- Thomas Kretschmer (artist)
- Thomas Kretschmer (politician)
