= Bernd Eisenfeld =

German writer and historian (1941–2010)

- Born: 9 January 1941; Falkenstein, Saxony, Germany
- Died: 12 June 2010 (aged 69); Berlin, Germany
- Occupation(s): Writer historian

Bernd Eisenfeld (9 January 1941 – 12 June 2010), also known by the pseudonym Fred Werner, was an opponent of the East German dictatorship who became a writer and an historian.

== Early years ==
Bernd Eisenfeld and his twin brother Peter were born in Falkenstein, a small industrial town with a tradition of metals mining and textiles production in the south-west of Saxony. The twins' birth came just over a year after the outbreak of the Second World War. There were two older brothers and a younger sister who became an opera singer, born in 1945. Brigitte Eisenfeld. The father, who worked as a court official, was a member of the NSDAP (Nazi Party) who as the war ended became an American prisoner of war. The winning powers had already designated the entire central part of Germany the Soviet occupation zone, however, and the Americans handed him over to the Soviets after which the father was interned in the NKVD Special Camp No. 1. After two and a half years in the camp, now an invalid, he was able to return home in 1949.

1949 was also the year in which the Soviet administered occupation zone was re-founded as the German Democratic Republic, a separate Soviet-sponsored single- party state with its constitutional arrangements modeled on those of the Soviet Union itself. At the age of fifteen, already identified as a good chess player, Bernd Eisenfeld found his participation in a chess tournament officially blocked. Eisenfeld would later describe the experience as the beginning of his "immunization process(es) against the [ruling SED] party". He also noticed that the virulently anti-American propaganda produced by the SED (party) contrasted with his own experiences of American soldiers whom he had met in the immediate aftermath of war, before the US forces had withdrawn to the internal German borders agreed between Roosevelt and Stalin at Yalta, and whom he had encountered more recently when visiting his Godmother in the western part of Berlin (which during the 1950s was still not as starkly divided, physically, as it became after 1961). He was also prevented from completing his school final exams and from pursuing his chosen career by training as a teacher. Instead between 1955 and 1958 he trained to become a bank clerk. A second period of further study followed at the Economics Academy in Gotha where between 1959 and 1961 he studied Finance.

== Thwarted academic career ==
From 1962 he was employed in Karl-Marx-Stadt by the East German central bank and by the bank's specialist division in Schkopau, which focused on the electro-chemical sector. He used his free time to study Philosophy, a subject he hoped to be able to study at university level. He became convinced that socialism incorporated the protection of civil liberties, which led him to reject the Soviet version of socialism enforced in the German Democratic Republic because of its illiberal character. From 1964 he submitted numerous letters of protest to national and international agencies in which he complained about The Wall. His letters did not go unnoticed by the East German authorities, and although he passed the aptitude exams for a correspondence study course in Philosophy and Cultural studies at Halle University, he was not permitted to join the course following his application in 1965/66, following a last minute retrospective modification to the stated admission criteria. An application in 1966 for a correspondence course in Cultural studies at Leipzig University also failed for political reasons.

== Objector to military service ==
In 1966 Eisenfeld refused to serve in the National People's Army not, he would insist, out of any religious or pacifist convictions, but because he did not wish to swear allegiance to The State and The Party. This made him, by default, a non-fighting so-called Construction soldier and brought him into contact with other opponents of the regime. Together with others, he now refused to swear the oath of the Construction soldiers. His protest was recorded by the Defence Ministry. Meanwhile, the Ministry for State Security listed him, along with three others, for its by now well-rehearsed "career spoiling" ("Zersetzung") programme. Eisenfeld had also attracted attention to himself by filing (unsuccessfully) an appeal for clemency on behalf of a colleague. Following the end of his period of service he found he had been relieved of his job at the bank, and faced a general employment ban across the extensive government sector. He reapplied for a study course, but his application failed. However, from 1 January 1968 he was able to work as a financial economist in the Leipzig chemical-engineering entity. He also, during this time, organised regular meetings of Construction soldiers under the auspices of the church.

== Opposition activities ==
In March 1968 he participated in a meeting at Halle held to discuss the government's continuing campaign of persecution against Robert Havemann who at that time was regarded as a dissident, being held under house arrest following the loss of his Party Membership and university post. At the meeting Eisenfeld openly criticised the East German draft constitution which the government had published as part of a move to align East Germany's constitution more closely with the realities of its power structure. He also expressed his support for free expression and for the Communist Reform Movement becoming mainstream in Czechoslovakia, under the leadership of Alexander Dubček. East Germany's state security establishment responded to Eisenfeld's speech by launching what they termed "Operation Economist" against him, making plans to arrest the dissident together with his two brothers, Ulrich and Peter. Before they could do this, however, in May 1968 the three brothers traveled to Prague, where they stayed for three days, and which they apparently managed to accomplish without the Ministry for State Security learning of their travel plans till it was too late to stop the brief trip. He flooded the "readers' letters" pages of East German newspapers with letters (which were never published), fulsome in support of the "Prague Spring". Following the Warsaw Pact invasion of Czechoslovakia on 20/21 August 1968, on 23 August 1968 Eisenfeld sent a telegram of solidarity to the Czechoslovak Embassy, containing the exhortations to "Stand firm and not give up hope" ("Halten Sie stand – Behalten Sie Hoffnung").

The next month, using a type-writer and carbon paper, he produced approximately 180 critical fly-sheets which he distributed in the Theaterplatz in Halle on 20 September 1968. The fly-sheets quoted Lenin's Decree on Peace, to which Eisenfeld had added his own plea, "Please think about it! Please don't stay silent!" ("Denk bitte nach! bitte, schweig nicht!!"). The next day he was preparing to distribute another batch of leaflets at the cinema, but instead he was arrested and detained in the Stasi "Red Ox" detention prison. More than two days later the Stasi archives from this period were accessed and it became apparent that Eisenfeld's arrest had already been planned, days before he had distributed any of the leaflets. By this time his wife was very pregnant. Bernd Eisenfeld was held in detention without access to a lawyer for the next three months. In February 1969 the regional court in Halle sentenced him in a closed hearing to a two and a half-year prison sentence for aggravated "anti-state propaganda". He was then held in a succession of prisons, starting with Rummelsburg, Karl-Marx-Stadt and Cottbus, and ending up at the Bautzen "Yellow Misery" prison which specialised in holding political prisoners. Eisenfeld refused the offer of a reduced sentence in return for a retraction of his statements. While he was detained he was also watched by a cell-mate who turned out to be a Stasi informer, working under the code name "IM Morles" who at one stage offered him preferential treatment in return for providing reports on other fellow prisoners, but this offer, too, was one that Eisenfeld felt able to refuse. At times he was the only political prisoner in a cell of five men, the other four being "conventional" criminals. Outside the prisons his twin brother faced harassment and his sick mother was also interrogated. The arrest of Bernd Eisenfeld had left his partner with their four-year-old daughter to look after single handed. A few months later she gave birth to their son. The authorities now offered her a pension if she would break with him, and this was followed by a sustained programme of pressure on her by the Ministry for State Security. When she still resisted this pressure she lost her job as a secretary.

After his release on 18 March 1971 Eisenfeld returned to his former work in Leipzig. Here he resumed his contacts with the Halle Peace Circle and with the Construction soldier organisation. The Ministry for State Security resumed their own official persecution regime. Eisenfeld submitted repeated applications to be able to emigrate to West Germany and also, in 1972, sent a file of papers on his case to the United Nations.

== Emigration ==
Permission to emigrate was finally granted in August 1975, but the authorities made it a condition that he should not disclose how many previous applications he had had rejected. Bernd Eisenfeld made for West Berlin with his family: his twin brother had too stay behind in East Germany. In West Berlin the family lived for half a year in the Marienfelde emergency refugee reception camp. He took a long time to find permanent employment because the Ministry for State Security had successfully planted rumours that he was in the west on a "secret mission" for them.

Published output (not a complete list)
- Bernd Eisenfeld: Kriegsdienstverweigerung in der DDR, ein Friedensdienst?, Frankfurt/Main 1978, ISBN 3-88129-158-X.
- Bernd Eisenfeld: Die Zentrale Koordinierungsgruppe Bekämpfung von Flucht und Übersiedlung, Der Bundesbeauftragte des Staatssicherheitsdienstes der ehem. DDR, Berlin 1995.
- Bernd Eisenfeld/Roger Engelmann: 13. August 1961: Mauerbau : Fluchtbewegung und Machtsicherung, Bremen 2001, ISBN 3-86108-790-1.
- Ehrhart Neubert/Bernd Eisenfeld: Macht Ohnmacht Gegenmacht. Grundfragen zur politischen Gegnerschaft in der DDR, Bremen 2001, ISBN 3-86108-792-8.
- Bernd Eisenfeld/Ilko-Sascha Kowalczuk/Ehrhart Neubert: Die verdrängte Revolution: der Platz des 17. Juni 1953 in der deutschen Geschichte, Bremen 2004, ISBN 3-86108-387-6.
- Bernd Eisenfeld: Der 17. Juni und die DDR-Opposition, in: Horch und Guck 12. Jg., Heft 42 (2/2003), S. 18–21.
- Bernd Eisenfeld: Bausoldaten in der DDR – ein Überblick, in: Horch und Guck 13. Jg., Heft 46 (2/2004), S. 1–8.
- Bernd Eisenfeld: Bausoldaten im Visier des MfS, in: Horch und Guck 13. Jg., Heft 46 (2/2004), S. 9–14.
- Bernd Eisenfeld, Peter Schicketanz: Bausoldaten in der DDR. Die „Zusammenführung feindlich-negativer Kräfte“ in der NVA. Mit einem Vorwort von Joachim Gauck. Ch. Links Verlag, Berlin, März 2011, ISBN 978-3-86153-637-6.
- Bernd Eisenfeld, Hubertus Knabe: West-Arbeit des MfS. Das Zusammenspiel von „Aufklärung“ und „Abwehr“. Ch. Links Verlag, Berlin 1999, ISBN 3-86153-182-8

He was able to work as a freelance writer, and under the pseudonym "Fred Werner" wrote a number of works on Conscientious objection (Wehrdienstverweigerung) in the German Democratic Republic (GDR). As leader in West Berlin of the local "League of Former GDR Citizens" ("Verband ehemaliger DDR-Bürger") he provided support for former East Germans who had been persecuted for their political views by the state and subsequently released into West Germany as part of the Political Detainees Ransome (Häftlingsfreikauf) programme that had been operated between East and West Germany since 1962.

From 1985 he worked for the "Whole German Institute" ("Gesamtdeutsches Institut"). Almost till the demise of the GDR in 1989/90 he was the target of a special Stasi "career spoiling" ("Zersetzung") operation, which identified him with the code name "Erz" and his twin brother Peter, still in East Germany, as "Polyp". In 1984/85 his travel ban to East Germany was lifted, but as matters turned out the ban was to be replaced by a secret (at that stage) plan to kidnap/arrest him on a visit made to Dresden in East Germany in connection with the Confirmation of his nephew.

In November 1989 the breach of The Wall and the absence of a military response from the Soviet Union triggered a succession of events that led to German reunification in October 1990. This (widely unforeseen) turn of events led to the dissolution of the "Whole German Institute" for which he had worked, and Bernd Eisenfeld switched to the Bonn based Federal Agency for Civic Education, while at the same time continuing with his writing career. Then, in 1992, he obtained a job back in Berlin with the Gauck Agency (as the BStU was known at that time). From 2000 he held a position at the agency as a Research Director, with particular focus on a project covering the use of X-rays by the Stasi in their anti-opposition work.

In October 2001 Bernd Eiesenfeld was one of the academics, historians and other writers who signed an open letter from the Bürgerbüro organisation of formerly East German civil rights activists which called on voters not to vote for the Party of Democratic Socialism (PDS), a successor political party to East Germany's Socialist Unity Party (SED), then in the process of trying to reinvent itself for a multi-party democratic future: Bernd Eisenfeld was not alone in finding the party's reinvention process unpersuasive and the party has subsequently renamed itself again.

Bernd Eisnefeld died suddenly on 12 June 2010, thereby predeceasing his wife and children.
