= Gabriele Eckart =

German author (born 1954)

- Born: March 23, 1954 (age 72); Falkenstein, East Germany
- Education: Humboldt University of Berlin.
- Writing career
- Language: German

Gabriele Eckart (born March 23, 1954, in Falkenstein/Vogtland), is a German author.

== Life ==
Gabriele Eckart studied Philosophy from 1972 to 1976 at the Humboldt University of Berlin. She concluded her studies with the completion of her Staatsexamen. In 1979 she took part in a writing course at the German Literature Institute in Leipzig. After publishing two collections of her own poetry and a collection of travel memoirs, her next publication was supposed to have been a collection of interviews with people in Havelland. Small excerpts appeared in 1983 and 1984 in literature magazines in the German Democratic Republic, but the publication of the entire text, which contained numerous passages critical of relations in the German Democratic Republic, was prevented by government censorship. The book So sehe ick die Sache was therefore published openly only in West Germany.

In 1987, Eckart used a visit to the Frankfurter Buchmesse to relocate to the Federal Republic of Germany; she remained, however, a citizen of the German Democratic Republic. In 1988 she emigrated to the United States, where she continued her studies. In 1993 she earned her Master of Arts at the University of Texas at San Antonio, and her PhD from the University of Minnesota. She has worked as a Professor of German and Spanish at the Southeast Missouri State University in Cape Girardeau.

== Works ==
- Gabriele Eckart, Poesiealbum 80, Berlin 1974
- Tagebuch, Berlin 1978
- Per Anhalter, Berlin 1982
- Sturzacker, Berlin 1985
- Der Seidelstein, Berlin 1986. ISBN 3-371-00016-8
- Wie mag ich alles was beginnt, Köln 1987. ISBN 3-462-01860-4
- Frankreich heißt Jeanne, Berlin 1990. ISBN 3-371-00266-7
- Der gute fremde Blick, Köln 1992. ISBN 3-462-02198-2
- Sprachtraumata in den Texten Wolfgang Hilbigs, New York [u.a.] 1996. ISBN 0-8204-2645-8

== Publications ==
- So sehe ick die Sache, Köln 1984. ISBN 3-462-01666-0
