= Falkenstein, Saxony =

Falkenstein
- Town
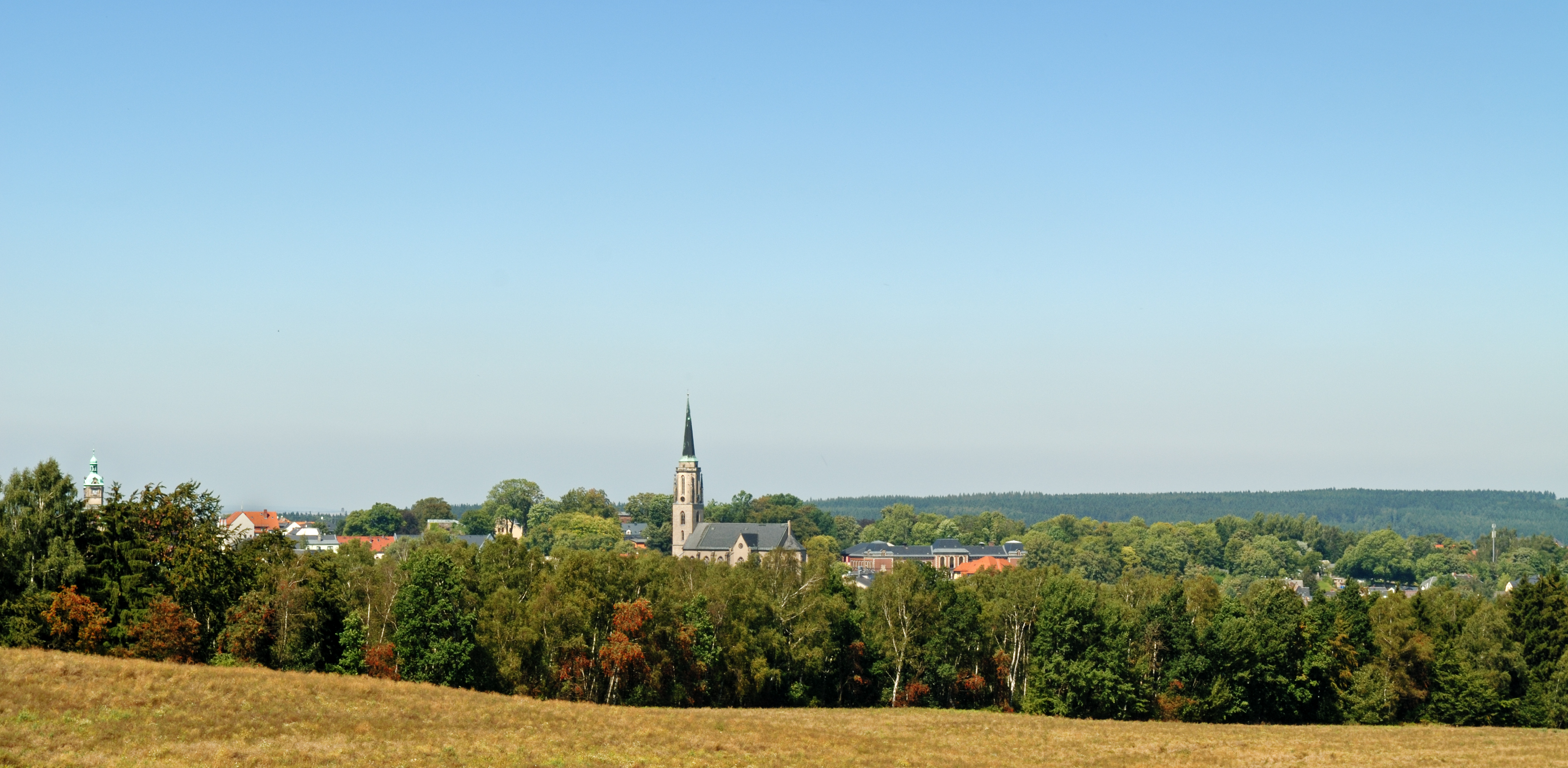

- Coat of arms

- Location of Falkenstein within Vogtlandkreis district
- Interactive map of Falkenstein
- Location within Germany Location within Saxony
- Coordinates: 50°28′N 12°22′E
- Country: Germany
- State: Saxony
- District: Vogtlandkreis
- Subdivisions: 3

Government
  - Mayor (2022–29): Marco Siegemund (CDU)

Area
  - Total: 31.06 km^{2} (11.99 sq mi)
- Elevation: 575 m (1,886 ft)

Population (2025-12-31)
  - Total: 7,321
  - Density: 235.7/km^{2} (610.5/sq mi)
- Time zone: UTC+01:00 (CET)
  - Summer (DST): UTC+02:00 (CEST)
- Postal codes: 08223, 08239
- Dialling codes: 03745
- Vehicle registration: V, AE, OVL, PL, RC

Falkenstein (German pronunciation: [ˈfalkn̩ˌʃtaɪn]) is a town in the Vogtlandkreis district, in Saxony, Germany. It is situated 4 km southwest of Auerbach, and 17 km east of Plauen.

== Population Development ==
Historical Population (ab 31 December 1960):

- 1834: 2,849
- 1875: 5,146
- 1880: 5,369
- 1912: 17,812
- 1933: 15,679
- 1946: 13,888 1
- 1950: 17,244 2
- 1960: 14,938
- 1971: 14,841
- 1981: 12,565
- 1984: 11,141
- 1998: 9,793
- 1999: 9,895
- 2000: 9,894
- 2001: 9,796
- 2002: 9,694
- 2003: 9,612
- 2004: 9,528
- 2007: 9,154
- 2012: 8,435
- 2013: 8,359

Datasource: Statistisches Landesamt Sachsen

== Sons and daughters of the city ==
- Otto Lindner (1893–1983), writer
- Gottfried Weimann (1907–1990), javelin thrower
- Helmut Rauca (1908–1983), perpetrator of the Holocaust, born in the district of Trieb
- Wolfgang Männel (1937–2006), economist
- Ulrich Eisenfeld (born 1939), painter
- Bernd Eisenfeld (1941–2010), historian and GDR opposition leader
- Gabriele Eckart (born 1954), writer
