= Karl-Heinz Kurras =

German police officer (1927–2014)

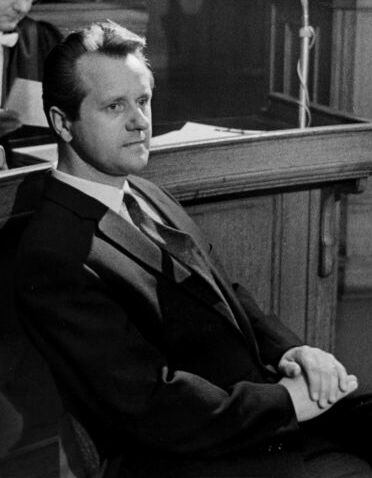
Kurras on trial for the killing of Benno Ohnesorg in 1967

Karl-Heinz Kurras (1 December 1927 – 16 December 2014) was a West German police inspector, known primarily for fatally shooting unarmed student Benno Ohnesorg in the back of the head during a demonstration on 2 June 1967, outside Deutsche Oper against the state visit of Mohammad Reza Pahlavi, the last Shah of Iran. Kurras was acquitted of any wrongdoing in a series of controversial trials, due to which he became a prominent hate figure of the left-wing German student movement of the 1960s as well as the German New Left. They suspected that Kurras was under protection from many right-wing figures (many of whom had served in posts under Nazism prior to 1945) in the West German police and justice system and who were resentful towards the left-wing students. The incident is considered pivotal for the rise of left-wing terrorism in West Germany during the 1970s, culminating with the Movement 2 June (named after the date when Ohnesorg was killed) and the Red Army Faction.

== Biography ==
Kurras was born in Barten, East Prussia. He was born as the son of a police officer in East Prussia. His father died while serving in the Wehrmacht during World War II. Kurras attended high school and in 1944, like most of his class after graduating from secondary school, volunteered for military service. He was wounded and fought in Battle of Berlin at the end of the war. There he began an administrative apprenticeship.

In December 1946, the Soviet secret police MVD arrested Kurras for illegally possessing weapons. In January 1947, a Soviet military tribunal convicted him of "counter-revolutionary sabotage" and sentenced him to 10 years in prison. Kurras was released from prison in February 1950.

After he had been acquitted of any wrongdoing in shooting Ohnesorg in 1967, the Federal Court of Justice subsequently ruled that the first court had failed to consider all the available evidence and ordered a new trial. Kurras was acquitted a second time.

In 1971 he rejoined the police force and was subsequently promoted to Detective Chief Inspector (German: Kriminaloberkommissar). He retired from the Berlin Police in 1987.

In an interview in 2007, he defended his decision to use lethal force against Ohnesorg, whom he accused of attacking him. He stated, "Anyone who attacks me will be destroyed. Off. Lights out. That is how you must see that." (German: "Wer mich angreift, wird vernichtet. Aus. Feierabend. So ist das zu sehen.")

He died on 16 December 2014 in Berlin.

== Stasi informant revelations ==
In May 2009, it was revealed that Kurras was an informant for the East German secret police, the Stasi. There is no evidence, however, of a link between the shooting of Ohnesorg and Kurras' espionage activities. When asked about the exposure of his Stasi and Communist past, he stated that he was not ashamed of having been a member of the East German communist party.

In January 2012 an investigation carried out by federal prosecutors and Der Spiegel magazine ruled that the shooting of Ohnesorg was not in self-defence. Newly examined film and photographic evidence also implicated fellow officers and superiors, proving that the West Berlin police covered up the truth in order to protect one of their own. Additionally, medical staff who carried out the post-mortem on Ohnesorg were pressured to falsify their report. However, for reasons of double jeopardy, charges were deemed unlikely to be refiled.

== Literature ==
- Uwe Soukup: Wie starb Benno Ohnesorg? Der 2. Juni 1967. Verlag 1900, Berlin 2007, ISBN 978-3-930278-67-1.
- Heinrich Hannover: Die Republik vor Gericht 1954–1995. Erinnerungen eines unbequemen Rechtsanwaltes. Aufbau-Taschenbuch-Verlag, Berlin 2005, ISBN 3-7466-7053-5 (Aufbau-Taschenbücher 7053).
- Helmut Müller-Enbergs, Cornelia Jabs: https://web.archive.org/web/20150218164655/http://www.deutschlandarchiv.info/download/article/416 "Der 2. Juni 1967 und die Staatssicherheit". In: Deutschland Archiv. Zeitschrift für das vereinigte Deutschland. 3, 42, 2009, ISSN 0012-1428, S. 395–400.
- Armin Fuhrer: Wer erschoss Benno Ohnesorg? Der Fall Kurras und die Stasi. be.bra verlag, Berlin 2009, ISBN 978-3-89809-087-2.
- Uwe Soukup, Karl Heinz Roth, Karl-Heinz Dellwo: 2. Juni 1967. Laika-Verlag, Hamburg 2010, ISBN 978-3-942281-70-6. (Bibliothek des Widerstands) (1 Medienkombination: Buch und DVD-Video).
- Sven Felix Kellerhoff: Die Stasi und der Westen. Der Kurras-Komplex. Hoffmann und Campe, Hamburg 2010, ISBN 978-3-455-50145-2.
- Marc Tschernitschek: Der Todesschütze Benno Ohnesorgs: Karl-Heinz Kurras, die Westberliner Polizei und die Stasi. Tectum, Marburg 2013, ISBN 978-382-88312-1-6
