= Christianity in East Germany =

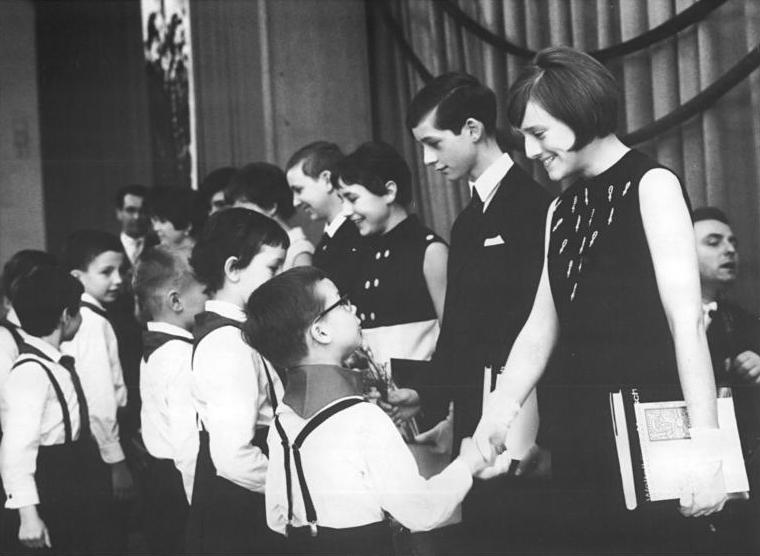
Jugendweihe in Berlin 1968. The SED established the rite of passage instead of confirmation, which led to ongoing conflicts with the churches.

Christianity in East Germany underwent several phases, ranging from state repression to state co-option. Christianity in East Germany also came up against secularism that saw the Church struggle to maintain its influence at times.

== Different confessions in East Germany ==
=== Protestantism ===
At the start of the German Democratic Republic, most of the people on its territory were Protestants, with exception of the Eichsfeld, a small Catholic area in the northwestern part of Thuringia, a former property of the archdiocese of Mainz.

See also

- Evangelical Church of the Union / Evangelische Kirche der Union (EKU); sections Postwar and Into the 1950s

=== Catholicism ===
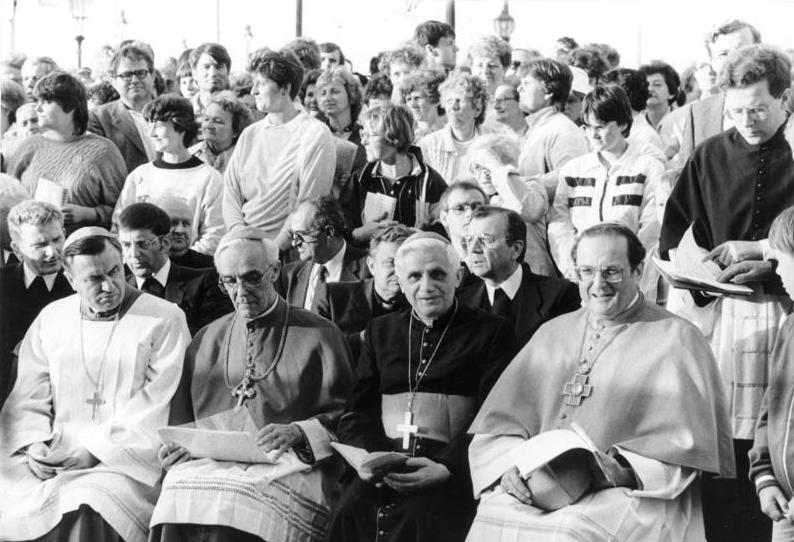
Katholikentag, Dresden, 1987 (left to right) Bishop Karl Lehmann and Cardinals Gerhard Schaffran, Joseph Ratzinger and Joachim Meisner.

Right after the war, many Catholic parishes were cut off from their dioceses in the western part of Germany.

Since the 16th-century Protestant Reformation, Catholics had been a minority on the territory that became East Germany after the war. Due to the post-war flight and expulsion of Germans from Eastern Europe to the west of the new Oder–Neisse line, refugees who resettled in East Germany increased the portion of Catholics between 1945 and 1949 to 13.9%. Between the establishment of the GDR in 1949 and the construction of the Berlin Wall in 1961, about 1.1 million Catholics left the GDR. From 1961 to 1988, their number shrunk further to 1.05 million Catholics, about 6% of the population.

== History of Protestantism in East Germany ==
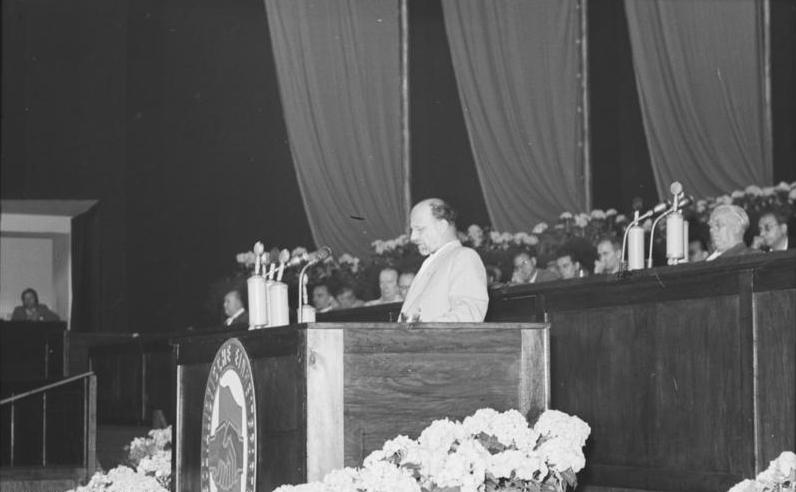
Walter Ulbricht proclaims an "intensification of the class struggle" during the 1952 SED party congress.

=== 1945–1952: early years ===
On 5 June 1945, following the end of World War II in Europe, Soviet authorities established the Soviet occupation zone within Germany, installing a provisional government for the former Prussian provinces of Brandenburg, Saxony and the western part of Pommerania, as well as for the Länder of Mecklenburg, Saxony, Thuringia and Anhalt. Political parties that had been forbidden in Nazi Germany were allowed to resume their activities in 1945, including the Communist Party of Germany led by Walter Ulbricht, the Social Democratic Party of Germany, the Christian CDUD and the liberal LDPD. The first two parties merged into the Socialist Unity Party of Germany (SED) in 1946, which won the first regional elections and gradually managed to erode the significance of the other parties. The SED party congress formed a Popular Council in 1948, which declared itself a provisional parliament on 7 October 1949, adopted a constitution and proclaimed the German Democratic Republic (GDR) on the same day. In the years after that, the GDR quickly evolved into a de facto single-party socialist state.

In general, through the early postwar period (1945–1949), the state pursued a moderate policy toward the church. This could be attributed to several reasons, one of which was that the church generally opposed Hitler. Beyond this, there was also a human need for the ministrations of the Church in the wake of the trauma and widespread devastation caused by the war. The Church was even exempted from the land reform conducted through 1945–1946 that sought to parcel large estates and distribute them among individual farmers, indicating their privileged position. Additionally, the Church was invited to join all-party talks held with the aim of establishing a single, non-partisan youth movement helmed by Erich Honecker.

However, this phase did not last long. In general, the period from 1949 to 1961 was characterised largely by visible repression of the Church. A variety of strategies were adopted by the SED to varying degrees over time, seeking to quicken the ‘withering away’ of religion under communism. Publishing books and communications were hindered by the scarcity of paper, the post-war destruction also deprived the church of buildings for their gatherings and services. The burgeoning conflict between the Church and State manifested clearly in the arena of education. In 1946, the State issued a decree that forbade the establishment of any kind of educational establishment apart from that provided by the state. Such a decree directly impacted religious education, and by the end of 1952, all religious education in schools had stopped.

=== 1952–1960s ===
1952 onwards marked a period of struggle and conflict between the state and the church. During the second party congress (9–12 July 1952), the SED abandoned its previously pronounced neutrality towards the churches. The announced "construction of socialism" (Aufbau des Sozialismus) required an "intensification of the class struggle" (Verschärfung des Klassenkampfes), including an offensive against the power of the churches. For example, Erich Mielke ordered an encompassing surveillance "of the churches and affiliate organisations such as the CDU" by the Ministry for State Security, because these "reactionary groups of people" were allegedly opponents of the construction of socialism. Arrests and convictions were already underway. In a famous 10 October 1957 speech in Sonneberg, Ulbricht stated that old traditional beliefs should be thrown overboard.

The GDR state sponsored atheism and tried to reduce the influence of the churches on society. The GDR's constitution ostensibly proclaimed the freedom of religious belief, while "Freedom of religion and liberty of conscience did not in reality exist, and the exercise of religion was obstructed in every conceivable way".

As the state sought to strengthen its youth movement, the ‘Freie Deutsche Jugend’ (FDJ), the Church was viewed with increasing suspicion as a rival. In the period from the formation of the GDR, the drive for socialist transformation led the state to seek to curtail the church's social presence. The rivalry between the Church and state intensified over two issues, namely the Jugendweihe and the provision of military chaplains.

The Jugendweihe, the youth ceremony of the FDJ, introduced in 1954 was an initiation rite that acted as a secular substitute for confirmation. The State designed the ceremony such that participating in it would express affirmation to the State and socialism. The Church protested against this ceremony, denying anyone who participated in this ceremony admission into the confirmation classes. The State did not back down, and by 1958 it was essentially mandatory for every school child to attend it. While the Church held out as long as it could, its stance could not be sustained for long as the number of confirmations dropped sharply. This affair clearly delineated the limits of the Church's power and attraction to a society rapidly undergoing secularisation.

The second conflict in the 1950s emerged over the issue of military chaplaincy. At that time, the Protestant Churches in the GDR were constituent members of the EKD, which also consisted of churches in the West. The leaders of Federal Germany and the EKD signed an agreement to provide military chaplains for West German armed forces, igniting outcry in East Berlin. This led to calls for the churches in the GDR to officially disassociate themselves from the West German ‘NATO Church’. Though the East and West German Church remained united, state pressure on the East German Church to separate from the EKD continued to grow, and the GDR churches gradually grew more distant from the ‘NATO-church’ in the West.

=== 1960s ===
The 1960s witnessed a declining Church, with shrinking portions of society expressing affiliation with the church. The church veered away from its defensive stance in the 50s, but was able to maintain its presence in some areas. In 1962, when the GDR introduced military conscription, an opportunity for the church to maintain its sphere of influence presented itself in the form of ‘construction soldiers’ (Bausoldaten). Many of these young people with a pacifist conscience thus came under the wing of the church. The 1960s also saw the church adapting more to the situation in the GDR, rather than trying to change it as in the 50s.

=== 1969: formation of the BEK ===
The issue of separation within the EKD all-German church body became more acute in 1961 with the building of the Wall, rendering it impossible for the Church to meet physically. The synod had to be split into two parts, one East and one West, meeting separately. As it became clear that re-unification would not take place, the East German church decided to form the ‘Bund der evangelischen Kirchen in der DDR’ (BEK), splitting from the EKD. This was not just a change in name but also symbolic of a re-orientation within the Church. The clergymen that were now in positions of authority had largely grown up in divided Germany, and were less fixated on a vision of a reunified Germany. Instead, they believed that their duty, first and foremost, was towards their own parish and GDR society.

=== Start of the Honecker era ===
Over time, the church appeared less of a threat. Bishop Schönherr's well-worn refrain of being a church not against, not alongside, but within socialism enabled the church to accommodate the regime in different ways. Thus when Honecker came into power, his early policy was characterised by outward toleration. The policy of no taboos in culture and the signing of the Helsinki agreement seemed to signal that the state was more willing to accommodate church. The state also benefited from the churches’ activities - the church ran hospitals, old people's homes, orphanages and additionally was a source of hard currency contributions. The hard currency came from the West German churches.

Nonetheless, discrimination against individual Christians continued, and the scope for spiritual freedom remained limited. What remains clear is that the situation in the 1970s was vastly different from the visible struggles of the 1950s.

=== Later Honecker years ===
Church/state relations only became more complex with the signing of the church/state agreement of 6 March 1978. Considered a watershed agreement, the church was able to secure a degree of official recognition within the communist system. This was by no means an extension of goodwill, but was a move undertaken by the state to stabilise the regime. The oil crises of 1973 and 1979 heavily impacted the German economy and the population was increasingly restless, with the Helsinki agreements having raised their expectations beyond what the regime was willing to concede. Thus, not only was the church/state agreement of 1978 a defensive move, it was also offensive in nature. Documents now made available reveal that the state viewed the agreement as a means to co-opt the church leadership as a “long arm of the state”, controlling the segments of society that the party-state could not reach.

This initially seemed an ingenious solution, with the church's greater degree of autonomy leading many dissidents to flock to the church as a gathering place. At least until the mid-1980s, much of the church leadership dutifully regulated dissident activity, keeping them within bounds and sustaining their end of the bargain with the state. SED officials would remind church leaders that concessions granted in 1978 could be rescinded, and thus church leaders were expected to ensure activities within the church did not get out of hand. In this way, the SED managed to ventilate dissent effectively.

However, this compromise soon backfired. The SED assumed that the church leadership could control all activities within their four walls, but under the protection of the church, groups were able to discuss sensitive issues concerning peace, human rights and the environment. The space this granted to these groups boosted their organisational capacities. In this way, the church regained political relevance as a platform through which movements and alternative points of view could flourish, paving the way for the church to take on a prominent role in the fall of the GDR.

=== Die Wende ===
In the last few years of the GDR, more and more citizens began to use the voting booths. Church congregations organized themselves to ensure that members were present at every voting location. These members encouraged voters to exercise their right to use the voting booths. After polls were closed, church members participated in the counting and recording of tallies. The government was actually happy to have the church representatives present. For as long as the churches certified the results, the government had even more reason to claim legitimacy.

In May, 1989, however, it was exactly the church who destroyed the government's credibility. Popular unrest was rising, and many more citizens were willing to voice their dissatisfaction with their votes. At the May 7th elections, church members were once again present to insure fair play. On the next day, state-controlled newspapers published only overall vote totals for larger metro areas without providing totals from each local poll. The results claimed commanding support for the government. Church members, in disbelief of the high percentage of supporting votes, began collecting counts from other local churches who had been present at other local polls. Their totals proved that the government reports were false.

The government fraud came as the last straw for many East German citizens. It was shortly thereafter, when Hungary opened its borders, that disillusioned thousands began to flee the country. The discovered voting manipulation served as perhaps the greatest catalyst in bringing about the revolution at that time. Had the churches not acted as a guard against this deception, party candidates would have held their claims to legitimacy.

The church had a central role before and after the Revolution. They would take part in conducting dialogue between the citizens and government officials. They were also involved in planning mass protest and provided activists groups with safe places to meet. After the revolution the church was involved in the forum debating the future shape and structure of the new German society and government. Many high ranking church figures even got important positions in this new German government.

== The Church and the opposition ==
The church's role in peace is also, in part, a dialectical function of the activities of peripheral groups and the mood of society-at-large.

=== Bausoldaten ===
Introduction of conscription in the GDR in 1962 caused considerable resistance, particularly by clergy and theology students, leading in 1964 to the creation of unarmed construction units (Bausoldaten, literally construction soldiers) attached to the military. This did not end the controversy, however, since Bausoldaten were often employed on military projects and suffered discrimination in career chances. Church criticism continued through the early 1970s until 1975, when an agreement was reached with the state limiting the Bausoldaten to nonmilitary objects. However, the scope of the debate regarding alternative service widened in the late 1970s and early 1980s.

Increasing numbers of nonclergy opted for Bausoldat status (roughly 1000/year currently). Many youth petitioned in 1981 for a positive alternative to military service, a "social peace service" similar to that in the FRG, entailing service in hospitals and other social welfare institutions. The church had backed this proposal, but the state rejected it as unrealistic. Nonetheless, the church has long given moral support to total conscientious objectors and some segments seem to be moving in the direction of supporting pacifism as "the clearer signal of peace service," as opposed to the EKD's continued equivocal stance supporting "peace service, with or without weapons."

== The Church and the Stasi ==
With the opening of archives, many have questioned whether the church was really an autonomous actor, but rather had been subverted in its independence by the secret police. Stasi success in recruiting informers and “unofficial collaborators” from within the ranks of the churches themselves, including several pastors came to light in the Stasi files. According to Bishop Hempel, out of the 1050 pastors in his diocese of Saxony, twenty were known to have worked for the Stasi. The Stasi Records Agency ascertained that to date, it was aware of 113 cases in the whole country. This thus represented only a small fraction of the estimated four thousand pastors in East Germany. While there did exist compromised individuals who colluded with the state, in general institutional autonomy was not seriously eroded. One of the most notable counter-examples would be Manfred Stolpe, who was revealed to have had extensive contacts with the Stasi, meeting with the Stasi at least 1,000 times. He later became the Prime Minister of Brandenburg. However, it is worth noting that numerous leaders who were instrumental in formulating church policy were not informal collaborators.

== See also ==
- Persecution of Christians in the Eastern Bloc
- Persecutions of the Catholic Church and Pius XII
- Persecution of Christians in the Soviet Union
- Religion in Germany
