= Helmut Müller-Enbergs =

German political scientist (born 1960)

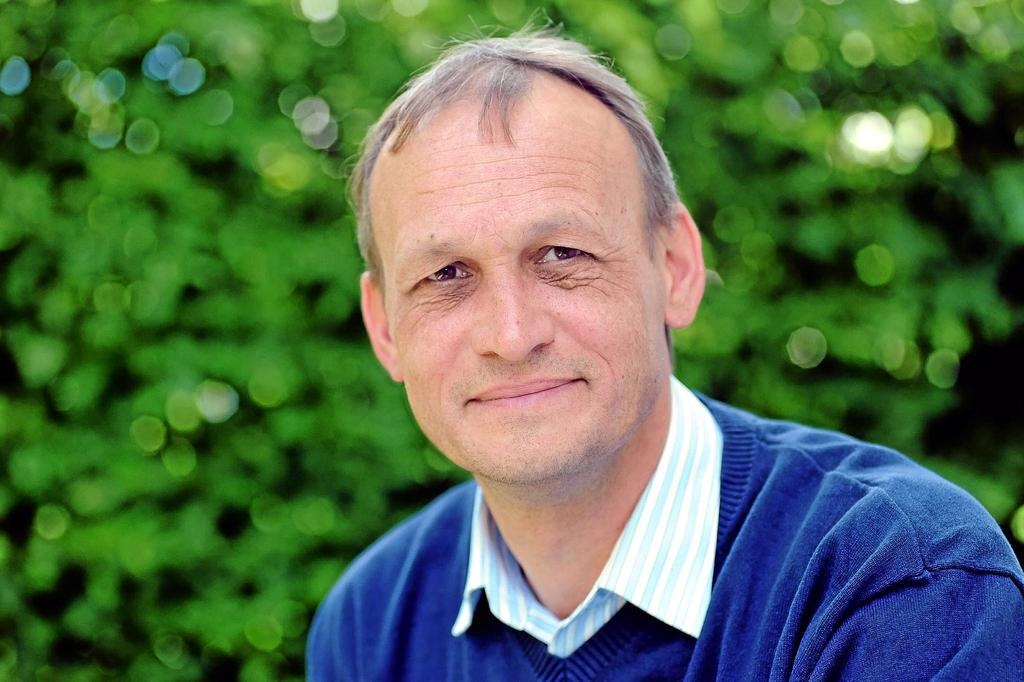
- Helmut Müller-Enbergs
- Born: 1960 (age 65–66); Haltern (NRW), West Germany
- Occupations: Academic; Writer; Political Scientist

Helmut Müller-Enbergs (born Haltern/NRW 1960) is a German political scientist who has written extensively on the Stasi and related aspects of the German Democratic Republic's history.

== Life ==
Müller-Enbergs studied Political sciences between 1986 and 1989, initially at the "Westfälische Wilhelms-Universität“ in Münster and subsequently at the Otto Suhr Institute (part of the Free University of Berlin). From 1986 till 1989 he was a research student, later becoming a research assistant at the Free University's Central Research Institute. Meanwhile, he turned up as a press spokesperson for the "Bündnis 90" (moderate) political grouping in the Brandenburg regional parliament, where he also provided technical support to the Stolpe committee of enquiry.

Since 1992 he has been a research officer with the Federal Commission for the Stasi Records ("Bundesbeauftragter für die Stasi-Unterlagen"). He is a co-author of the official report on Gregor Gysi (1996) prepared for the Immunity Committee of the Bundestag (German national legislature). Between 2003 and its dissolution in 2005 Müller-Enbergs headed up the Rosenholz Research Group.

Currently (2014) his research is focused on detailed investigation of Informal collaborators (sometimes known as undercover informers) and the Main Intelligence Administration "Hauptverwaltung Aufklärung") of the East German Ministry for State Security (Stasi), as well as on espionage and "Intelligence service Psychology".

He gained a doctorate in 2007. His doctoral dissertation was produced under the supervision of Prof. Eckhard Jesse, the high-profile (in Germany) expert on extremism and terrorism at the University of Technology in Chemnitz. In 2007/08 Dr. Müller-Enbergs was a visiting scholar at the University of Michigan in Ann Arbor. In 2008/09 he had a visiting professorship at the Arts Faculty of the University of Southern Denmark at Odense, where since 2010 he has been an honorary professor in the Department of History. Additionally, in 2011/12 he became a visiting professor (designated an honorary professor since 2012) at the History Faculty at the Gotland Campus, now part of Uppsala University despite its island location at Visby.

Back in Germany, in 2010 he was elected to membership of two Brandenburg based commissions dealing with

(1) Co-operation between deputies in the regional parliament of Brandenburg and the Stasi and
(2) Understanding the history, and dealing with the consequences of, the one-party dictatorship, and of the transition to a democratic state governed according to the rule of law in Brandenburg.

== Controversies ==
=== Kurras affair ===
Together with Cornelia Jabs, Müller-Enbergs unmasked, in the journal Deutschland Archiv, the West Berlin policeman Karl-Heinz Kurras as the former SED (i.e. East German communist party) member and Stasi informer "Otto Bohl". Although the director of the Research Department at the Stasi Records Office had, in writing, released the piece for publication, Müller-Enbergs found himself formally admonished by the organisation's board in respect of it: later, in a wide-ranging interview it was powerfully implied that the board of the Stasi record office might have behaved as it did in response to direct or indirect pressure from various quarters, including a formerly Dresden based Russian KGB senior officer, Vladimir Putin. Müller-Enbergs applied, successfully, for the board's admonishment to be removed from his personnel file, and the matter appeared settled with Müller-Enbergs' reported acceptance that he had not sufficiently informed the board in respect of the Kurras disclosures.

=== IM Bob and IM Petra ===
In Autumn 2012 the board refused him support in trials against two alleged former East German spies known as "IM Bob" and "IM Petra". Academics, journalists and persecution victims from the days of the one party dictatorship now showed him unanimous solidarity. At the start of 2013 the Deuling couple withdrew from linking their name in a plaint against Helmut Müller-Enbergs. This happened after the court to which the case had been assigned pronounced the case beyond its competence, requiring the matter to be handled under a different legal procedure. This appears to open the way for Müller-Enbergs to conclude the matter with a legally binding assertion that agents "IM Bob" and "IM Petra" are indeed the Deuling couple.

== Publications (selection) ==
- Der Fall Rudolf Herrnstadt. Tauwetterpolitik vor dem 17. Juni. Ch. Links Verlag: Berlin 1991
- Von der Illegalität ins Parlament. Werdegang und Konzepte der neuen Bürgerbewegungen. (Hrsg. mit Marianne Schulz und Jan Wielgohs), 1991
- Wer war wer in der DDR? Ein biographisches Lexikon. (Hg. mit Dieter Hoffmann und Jan Wielgohs) Ch. Links Verlag: 2000/2007/2010
- Bündnis 90. Entstehung – Entwicklung – Perspektiven. Berlin 1992 (Mithrsg.)
- Was will die Bürgerbewegung? Augsburg 1993 (Hrsg.)
- Wer war wer in der DDR? 2146 Biographien zur DDR-Geschichte. Ein elektronisches Lexikon unter Windows. (Hg. mit Bernd-Rainer Barth, Christoph Links und Jan Wielgohs), 1995
- Inoffizielle Mitarbeiter des Ministeriums für Staatssicherheit. Teil 1: Richtlinien und Durchführungsbestimmungen. (Hg.) Ch. Links Verlag: Berlin 1996
- Inoffizielle Mitarbeiter des Ministeriums für Staatssicherheit. Teil 2: Anleitung für die Arbeit mit Agenten, Kundschaftern und Spionen in der Bundesrepublik Deutschland. (Hrsg.) Ch. Links Verlag: Berlin 1998
- Inoffizielle Mitarbeiter des Ministeriums für Staatssicherheit. Teil 3: Statistiken. (in collaboration with Susanne Muhle) Ch. Links Verlag: Berlin 2007
- Das Fanal. Das Opfer des Pfarrers Brüsewitz und die evangelische Kirche (zus. mit Heike Schmoll und Wolfgang Stock). Frankfurt/Main 1993 (2. Aufl. Münster 1999)
- Das Gesicht dem Westen zu … DDR-Spionage gegen die Bundesrepublik Deutschland. Bremen 2003 (Hrsg. gem. mit Georg Herbstritt) (3. Aufl. 2006)
- Rechts und links der Demokratie. Extremisten zur Landtagswahl 2004, (zus. mit Jonas Grutzpalk), Landesamt für Verfassungsschutz, Potsdam 2004.
- Die Nachrichtendienstschule. Der I. Kursus der Schule des Instituts für wirtschaftswissenschaftliche Forschung (IWF). (Hefte zur DDR-Geschichte, Hrsg. vom Verein Helle Panke) Berlin 2006
- Geheimhaltung und Transparenz. Demokratische Kontrolle der Geheimdienste im internationalen Vergleich. Münster 2006 (zus. Hrsg. mit Wolbert K. Smidt, Ulrike Poppe and Wolfgang Krieger)
- "Rosenholz". Eine Quellenkritik. (Hrsg. von der BStU) Berlin 2007
- Intelligence-Service Psychology. Frankfurt/Main 2008 (Mithrsg.)
- Die inoffiziellen Mitarbeiter. Berlin 2008, ISBN 978-3-942130-26-4.
- Sicherheit in Organisationen. Frankfurt/Main 2009 (Mithrsg.)
- Das Institut für Wirtschaftswissenschaftliche Forschung und die Anfänge der DDR-Spionage. (Hefte zur DDR-Geschichte, Hrsg. vom Verein Helle Panke) Berlin 2010
- East German Foreign Intelligence: Myth, Reality and Controversy. Routledge: London 2010 (zus. Hg. mit Thomas Wegener Friis, Kristie Macrakis)
- Die Kreisdienststelle Eisenach und ihr inoffizielles Netz. (Hrsg. von der Thüringer Landesbeauftragten für Stasi-Unterlagen) Erfurt 2010.
- Schriftenreihe „Studies in Intelligence Collection and Intelligence Analysis“ im Verlag Polizeiwissenschaft. Frankfurt/Main (seit 2008).
- Hauptverwaltung A (HV A), ISBN 978-3-942130-15-8 (Hrsg. von der BStU) Berlin 2011.
- Die Kreisdienststelle Greiz und ihr inoffizielles Netz (Hrsg. von der Thüringer Landesbeauftragten für Stasi-Unterlagen). Erfurt 2011.
- Der allmächtige Geheimdienst - Ein Relikt der Vergangenheit? Zur Transformation der Geheimdienste Mittel- und Osteuropas nach 1990 (zus. hrsg. mit Wolbert K. Smidt, Irina Mohr). Lit, Berlin, Münster 2012, ISBN 978-3-643-11792-2.
- Die Kreisdienststelle Meiningen des Staatssicherheitsdienstes. Eine Handreichung zur regionalen Aufarbeitung (together with Tom Pleiner). Berlin 2012.
