= Conscientious objection in East Germany =

There was a high level of conscientious objection in East Germany.

== Introduction of conscription ==
In April 1962, the German Democratic Republic (GDR) introduced military conscription for adult males between 18 and 26, with a period of compulsory service of at least 18 months. Service in the National People's Army (NVA), the paramilitary forces of the Volkspolizei, and the motorised rifles regiment of the Ministry for State Security (Stasi) fulfilled this service obligation. The GDR's introduction of conscription was a partial reaction to the Federal Republic of Germany (FRG) introducing conscription in 1958.

In the first year, 231 draftees conscientiously objected, despite the possibility of imprisonment or worse. Most of those who refused to serve in the military were members of the Jehovah's Witnesses. The number of conscientious objectors increased to 287 when the second year's cohort was conscripted. The GDR's Marxist-Leninist government held the view that conscientious objectors were enemies of the state and those who refused to serve were arrested. When the country's influential Protestant Church protested, the government decided to provide a legal means for conscientious objectors to serve as non-combatants in the armed forces.

== Baueinheiten ==
On 16 September 1964, the GDR government announced the formation of non-combat "construction units" (Baueinheiten), to provide an alternative for conscripts who could not bear arms because of a personal objection to military service. The Bausoldaten ("construction soldiers") lived in barracks and were subject to military discipline, but did not bear arms or participate in combat training. Their grey uniforms resembled those of the regular infantry with the symbol of a spade on their shoulder boards which had pale green edges. They performed military construction and rear-guard services, repaired tanks and military equipment, as well as some tasks in the industrial and social service sectors, were subject to military law and disciplinary regulations, were commanded by NVA officers and non-commissioned officers (NCOs), and received engineer training and political education. Outwardly peaceful in appearance, soldiers in Baueinheiten were obliged to make an oath of loyalty in which they stated that they would "fight against all enemies and obey their superiors unconditionally", though this was replaced by an oath to "increase defence readiness" in the 1980s.

Construction units were normally isolated from soldiers in regular units, and mainly served to prevent the spread of pacifist ideas while also satisfying the churches.

In 1983, of the 230,000 soldiers in the NVA, 0.6 percent (about 1,400) were allowed to serve in the construction units. According to one report, however, the number of conscripts electing such service became so high that draft officials claimed the plan was over fulfilled, and in 1983 young East Germans unwilling to bear arms had to join the regular troops. In February 1983, in Schwerin, Dresden, and East Berlin, five young men were sentenced to eighteen months in prison because they tried to exercise their right to join the construction units.

Service in the construction troops did, however, have certain consequences. In the 1970s, GDR leaders acknowledged that former construction soldiers were at a disadvantage when they rejoined the civilian sphere. They were not allowed to enter certain professions or to pursue a university education. In 1984, Socialist Unity Party of Germany (SED) General Secretary Erich Honecker and Defence Minister Army General Heinz Hoffmann asserted that construction soldiers no longer suffered such discrimination; like others who had completed their military service, they were given preference in the university admission process.

== Prague Spring ==
In 1968, the Warsaw Pact states of Bulgaria, Hungary, Poland, the Soviet Union invaded Czechoslovakia to prevent the liberalisation reforms of Alexander Dubček, in what came to be known as the Prague Spring. The invasion, in which East Germany did not directly participate but gave tacit support, was highly controversial including within the communist world. People all over the world were appalled, but especially East Germans, many of whom felt guilty for letting their government support it. Following the Prague Spring, conscientious object rose sharply as many young East German men refused to serve even in Baueinheiten. They felt that something akin to another Prague Spring could be just around the corner, and they wished to play no part in it.

== Leaving East Germany ==
Since the erection of the Berlin Wall in 1961, it was very difficult to emigrate legally from East Germany, as part of a state campaign to discourage people from leaving permanently. Between 1984 and 1985, 71,000 East Germans were expelled from the country for participation in civil rights movements. Many people who wished to emigrate from East Germany would do things such as refuse to serve in the NVA to be put on the "black list" and expelled.

By the late 1980s, the vast majority of conscientious objectors was composed of people who wished to emigrate.

== Literature ==
- Bernd Eisenfeld: Kriegsdienstverweigerung in der DDR - ein Friedensdienst? Genesis, Befragung, Analyse, Dokumentation. Haag+Herchen, Frankfurt 1978. ISBN 3-88129-158-X.
