= Wolfgang Männel =

German academic (1937–2006)

Wolfgang Männel (October 18, 1937 in Falkenstein, Saxony – September 26, 2006) was a German professor of Business Administration.

== Academic contributions ==
Männel was born as the son of the German entrepreneur Max Rudolf Männel and his wife Liska. He graduated at the University of Mannheim. In 1972, Männel became professor of Business Administration at the University of Frankfurt, in 1973 at the University of Dortmund and in 1982 at the University of Erlangen-Nuremberg.

He influenced the German Business Administration a lot with works about cost accounting. His literature is stilled used by almost every German student in this academic field.
