= Ilko-Sascha Kowalczuk =

German historian and author

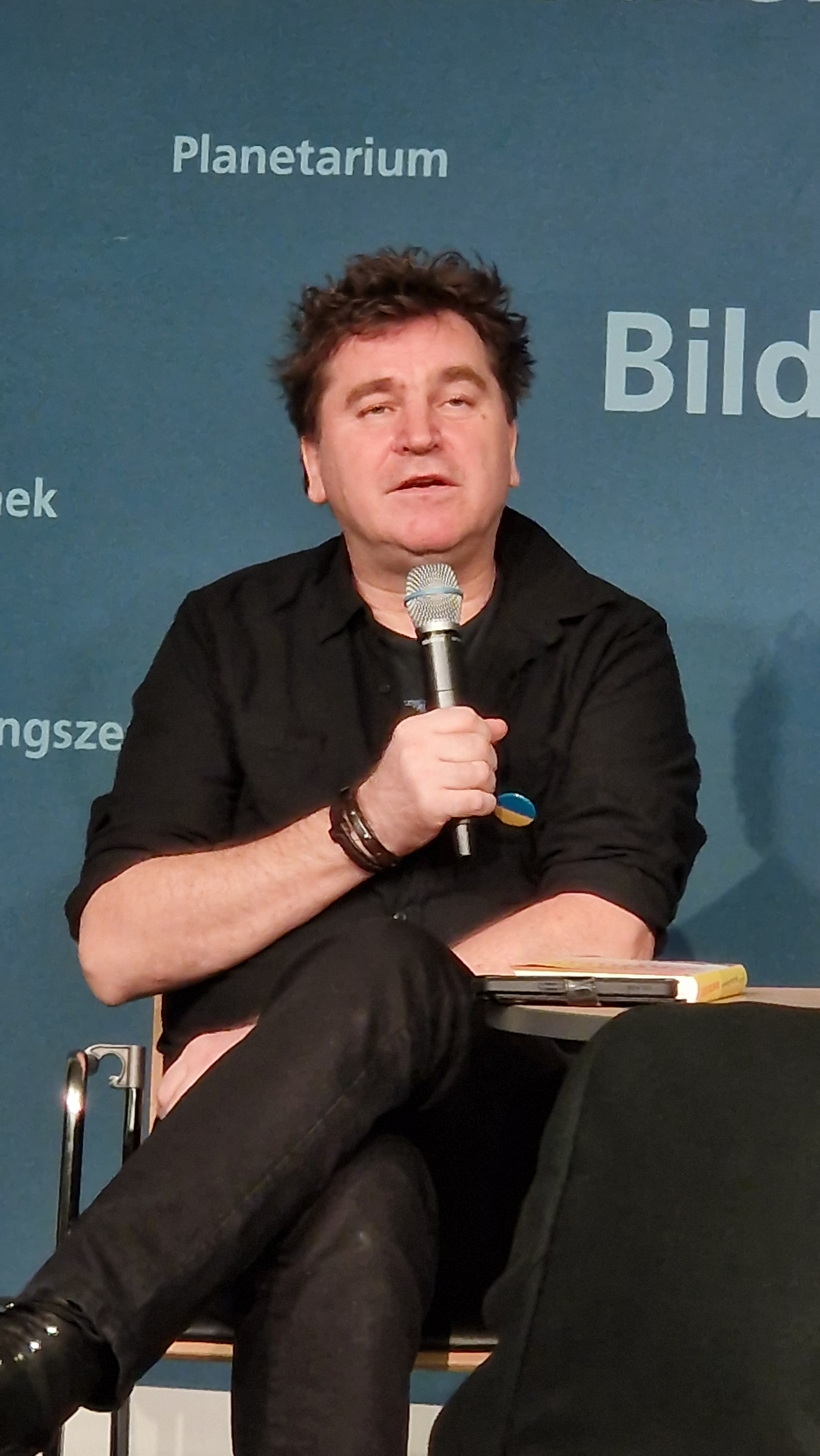
- Kowalczuk at a publishing event in Nuremburg, 2025
- Born: 1967 (age 58–59); East Berlin, East Germany
- Occupations: Historian; author
- Spouse: Susan Arndt

Ilko-Sascha Kowalczuk (born 1967) is a German historian and author. His work is focused on the German Democratic Republic (GDR) and its Ministry for State Security.

== Career ==
Kowalczuk trained initially as a mason, and then worked as a janitor. In 1990 he began his study of history at the Humboldt University of Berlin, receiving his doctorate from nearby Potsdam University in 2002.

Since 1990 Kowalczuk has been a member of the "Independent Historians' League" ("Unabhängige Historiker Verband"). Between 1995 and 1998 he served as an "honorary expert member" on the Commission set up by the German Bundestag to try to resolve some of the open questions left over from the single-party dictatorship that had, till 1990, been the GDR.

In 2019, Kowalczuk was appointed by the Federal Ministry of the Interior, Building and Community to serve on the committee that oversaw the preparations for the 30th anniversary of German reunification.

== Personal life ==
Kowalczuk identifies as East German. His interest for Eastern European history derives from the story of his family. Kowalczuk's grandfather was a Ukrainian from modern-day Lviv Oblast, who fought in World War I and later served in the Ukrainian Galician Army. After the war, he fled to Bohemia, where a large Ukrainian diaspora resided. After his death, in 1945 his widow and two children were deported to Germany. Kowalczuk's father was a devout Communist, but continued to follow some Ukrainian traditions, such as celebration of Christmas.

== Select bibliography ==
- End Game. The 1989 Revolution in East Germany. Berghahn, New York, Oxford 2022, ISBN 978-1-80073-621-4
- Paperback End Game. The 1989 Revolution in East Germany.' Berghahn, New York, Oxford 2026, ISBN 978-1-80758-076-6
- Freedom Shock. A Different History of East Germany from 1989 to Today. (= Ukrainian Voices, vol. 93), ibidem Verlag, Hannover, Stuttgart 2026
- The revolution in Germany. The end of the SED dictatorship, East German society, and reunification. In: Frederic Bozo, Andreas Rödder, Mary Elise Sarotte (eds.): German Reunification. A multi-national history. New York 2017, S. 15 – 42
- For social justice, freedom and unity – the popular uprising of 17 Juni 1953 in East Berlin. In: György Dalos, Ilko-Sascha Kowalczuk, Jean-Yves Potel: One a long way to democracy: from Berlin to Gdansk via Budapest and Prague. European Trade Union Institute (ETUI). Brussels 2022, ISBN 978-2-87452-633-6
- „Born in the GDR": Ronald Reagan and the East Germans. In: Helmut Trotnow, Florian Weiß (Hrsg.): Tear down this wall. Berlin 2007, S. 272 – 295
- Everyday Life in the GDR and the MfS. in: State Security. A Reader On The GDR Secret Police. Berlin 2016, S. 69 – 76, ISBN 978-3-94657-243-5
- (Ed.): Der Tag X – 17. Juni 1953. Die „Innere Staatsgründung“ der DDR als Ergebnis der Krise 1952/54 (= Forschungen zur DDR-Geschichte. 3). Ch. Links, Berlin 1995, ISBN 3-86153-083-X
- Legitimation eines neuen Staates. Parteiarbeiter an der historischen Front. Geschichtswissenschaft in der SBZ/DDR 1945 bis 1961. Ch. Links, Berlin 1997, ISBN 3-86153-130-5.
- with Stefan Wolle: Roter Stern über Deutschland. Sowjetische Truppen in der DDR. Ch. Links, Berlin 2001, ISBN 3-86153-246-8.
- (Ed.): Freiheit und Öffentlichkeit. Politischer Samisdat in der DDR 1985–1989. Eine Dokumentation (= Schriftenreihe des Robert-Havemann-Archivs. 7). Robert-Havemann-Gesellschaft, Berlin 2002, ISBN 3-9804920-6-0
- Geist im Dienste der Macht. Hochschulpolitik in der SBZ/DDR 1945 bis 1961. Ch. Links, Berlin 2003, ISBN 3-86153-296-4
- 17. Juni 1953 – Volksaufstand in der DDR. Ursachen – Abläufe – Folgen. Edition Temmen, Bremen 2003, ISBN 3-86108-385-X.
- Das bewegte Jahrzehnt. Geschichte der DDR von 1949 bis 1961 (= ZeitBilder. 13). Bundeszentrale für Politische Bildung, Bonn 2003, ISBN 3-89331-521-7
- with Bernd Eisenfeld & Ehrhart Neubert: Die verdrängte Revolution. Der Platz des 17. Juni 1953 in der deutschen Geschichte (= Der Bundesbeauftragte für die Unterlagen des Staatssicherheitsdienstes der ehemaligen Deutschen Demokratischen Republik. Analysen und Dokumente. 25). Edition Temmen, Bremen 2004, ISBN 3-86108-387-6
- with Roger Engelmann (Ed.): Volkserhebung gegen den SED-Staat. Eine Bestandsaufnahme zum 17. Juni 1953 (= Der Bundesbeauftragte für die Unterlagen des Staatssicherheitsdienstes der ehemaligen Deutschen Demokratischen Republik. Analysen und Dokumente. 27). Vandenhoeck & Ruprecht, Göttingen 2005, ISBN 3-525-35004-X
- with Torsten Diedrich (Ed.): Staatsgründung auf Raten? Zu den Auswirkungen des Volksaufstandes 1953 und des Mauerbaus 1961 auf Staat, Militär und Gesellschaft der DDR (= Militärgeschichte der DDR. 11). Ch. Links, Berlin 2005, ISBN 3-86153-380-4
- with Tom Sello (Ed.): Für ein freies Land mit freien Menschen. Opposition und Widerstand in Biographien und Fotos. Robert-Havemann-Gesellschaft, Berlin 2006, ISBN 3-938857-02-1.
- Endspiel. Die Revolution von 1989 in der DDR. Beck, München 2009, ISBN 978-3-406-58357-5.
- Die 101 wichtigsten Fragen – DDR (= Beck’sche Reihe. 7020). Beck, München 2009, ISBN 978-3-406-59232-4
- Stasi konkret. Überwachung und Repression in der DDR. Beck, München 2013, ISBN 978-3-406-63838-1
- 17. Juni 1953. Geschichte eines Aufstands. Beck, München 2013, ISBN 978-3-406-64539-6
- with Arno Polzin (Ed.): Fasse Dich kurz! Der grenzüberschreitende Telefonverkehr der Opposition in den 1980er Jahren und das Ministerium fuer Staatssicherheit. Vandenhoeck & Ruprecht, Göttingen 2014, ISBN 978-3-525-35115-4
- Die Übernahme. Wie Ostdeutschland Teil der Bundesrepublik wurde. Beck, München 2019, ISBN 978-3-406-74020-6
- mit Holger Kulick und Frank Ebert (Hrsg.): (Ost)Deutschlands Weg. 45 Studien & Essays zur Lage des Landes. Teil I – 1989 bis heute. Bundeszentrale für politische Bildung, Berlin/Bonn 2021
- mit Holger Kulick und Frank Ebert (Hrsg.): (Ost)Deutschlands Weg. 35 weitere Studien, Prognosen & Interviews. Teil II – Gegenwart und Zukunft. Bundeszentrale für politische Bildung, Berlin/Bonn 2021
- mit Judith Enders und Raj Kollmorgen (Hrsg.): Deutschland ist eins: vieles. Bilanz und Perspektiven von Transformation und Vereinigung. Campus Verlag, Frankfurt/Main, New York 2021, ISBN 978-3-593-51436-9
- Walter Ulbricht - Der deutsche Kommunist (1893-1945). Beck, München 2023, ISBN 978-3-406-80660-5
- Walter Ulbricht. Der kommunistische Diktator (1945–1973). Verlag C. H. Beck, München 2024, ISBN 978-3-406-81396-2
- Freiheitsschock. Eine andere Geschichte Ostdeutschlands seit 1989. Verlag C. H. Beck, München 2024, ISBN 978-3-406-82213-1
- mit Bodo Ramelow: wl (2025), Die neue Mauer: Ein Gespräch über den Osten., München: Verlag C.H. Beck, ISBN 978-3-406-83831-6
- wl (2026), Faschismus ist keine Meinung. Stabil bleiben in autoritären Zeiten., München: Verlag C.H. Beck, ISBN 978-3-406-84923-7
