= Unofficial collaborator =

Informant in the German Democratic Republic

An unofficial collaborator or IM (German: [iˈʔɛm]; both from German: inoffizieller Mitarbeiter), or euphemistically informal collaborator (informeller Mitarbeiter), was an informant in East Germany who delivered private information to the Ministry for State Security. At the end of the East German government, there was a network of around 189,000 informants, working at every level of society.

== History ==
Before 1968 the term "Secret Informer" ("Geheimer Informator") was used.

The network of secret informers, commonly known in German sources by the initials IM, was one of the most important instruments of repression and also one of the most critical pillars of power supporting the one-party state that ran East Germany.

The terms "Informal Collaborator" "Inoffizieller Mitarbeiter" and, before 1968, "Secret Informer" ("Geheimer Informator") were terms chosen carefully by the Stasi in order to distance their operations from the police vocabulary used under the previous regime, and, in particular, to avoid association with the older term used for an informant, "V-Mann" ("Vertrauensmann)"".

During the course of German reunification the Stasi archives were opened up: the identities of numerous IMs came to light, which opened the way for several human tragedies. At the same time many friendships, partnerships and marriages broke apart after previously concealed spying activities became known to both parties.

Since the changes of 1989/90, IM and the other terms here have sometimes also been used for informers who worked for Intelligence organisations other than the Stasi.

== Numbers ==
The number of Informal Collaborators (IMs) rose steeply in the years following the 1953 uprising to peak in 1962 at 108,400, before falling back for a few years. The all-time peak, of 203,000, was reached in 1977. By the time the regime collapsed the "IM headcount" number had stabilised at, on these figures, around 175,000.

The Stasi network of Informal Collaborators (IMs) covered all sections of the population in the Democratic Republic. The network provided crucial support to the country's elaborate surveillance system, and it made possible the monitoring of groups to which an identifiable Stasi officer could never have gained more direct access. There were IMs in many dissident groups and organisations, notably in artistic and church circles, so that the state was informed in particular detail about individuals defined in the official Stasi jargon as "enemy-negative persons" ("feindlich-negativer Personen")

During its lifetime the Stasi had around 624,000 Informal collaborators. IM numbers rose most steeply at times of societal crises, such as the aftermath of the 1953 uprising and the construction of the Berlin Wall (which began, with the official closing of the border surrounding West Berlin, in August 1961). They fell back a little in the mid-1960s for the initial phase of the period of reduced east-west tensions between the two Germanys associated with the time in office, first as Foreign Minister and then as Chancellor, of Willy Brandt, before climbing steeply through the early 1970s to peak at a little above 200,000 during the mid-1970s. The gentle decline in the overall number of the Informal collaborators for several years in the later 1970s is associated with new guidelines, intended to increase their professionalism. By the end of 1988 the number had declined to 173,081.

A more recently published study from Helmut Müller-Enbergs, published in 2010, put the number of Informal Collaborators in 1989 at 189,000.

=== The numbers challenged ===
A younger researcher on the subject, East Berlin born historian Ilko-Sascha Kowalczuk, questioned this figure in 2013, but without providing any similarly careful estimate of his own as to the number of IMs in 1988/89. There is a suggestion that Müller-Enbergs' higher figure includes people who operated under more than one cover name and in more than one IM category, leading to some double counting in his revised figure. Another consideration is that the Stasi data include many people who never actually reported anything to them. The Stasi themselves archived the records of nearly 10,000 inactive IMs in 1987. In 1988 the Stasi were using, internally, the much lower figure of 110,000. Kowalczuk also questioned the extrapolated figure for IMs based outside the country.

=== A challenge challenged ===
Kowalczuk's own figures, appearing in his book Stasi konkret (2013), have not gone unchallenged, with criticisms that his conclusions are empirically unconvincing, that his logic contains grave errors, and that his statistical approach is flawed. Assertions by Kowalczuk in the press appearing to state that the number of IMs was only half that previously accepted are inaccurate because they take no account of the massive broadening of information gathering activity by the Stasi that was a feature of the final years of the German Democratic Republic, and left almost every second citizen thinking himself a surveillance victim. Kowalczuk's employers at the Federal Commission for Stasi Records (BStU) in effect later distanced themselves from his figures, and an (in other respects unimportant) application by the Federal (national) government later in 2013 also implied rejection of Kowalczuk's position.

=== Informal collaborators in 1989 ===
The BStU continues to accept the Müller-Enbergs figure of 189,000 IMs, including more than 10,000 in the category "Gesellschaftlicher Mitarbeiter Sicherheit" (see #Categories below). The BStU believes that between 3,000 and 3,500 of these Stasi IMs were operating in West Germany and West Berlin, and they reckon that 1,550 of these were working for the HVA (effectively the "foreign" division of the intelligence service). It is in any event clear, as the BStU has repeatedly pointed out, that the term "Informal collaborator" ("Inoffizieller Mitarbeiter" / "Informeller Mitarbeiter"’ /"IM") was not always precisely defined, and that very careful investigation is needed in order to prove any individual case on order that the individual responsibility, or where appropriate the guilt, of any one person may be determined. The importance of treating each case individually is as important in serving the public just as for research purposes. Some have nevertheless claimed that there are essential differences between the two. The debate about numbers and the ensuing clarifications provided by the BStU have in the end provided some reassurance about the soundness of the 189,000 figure.

=== Other Stasi informants ===
There is also evidence that the Stasi had significant numbers of informants in addition to the IMs. In the residential areas the Stasi relied on "Information people" ("Auskunftspersonen " / AKPs), for information on neighbours. These were informants who in most circumstances would not themselves have been listed as IMs, and whose information gathering would mostly have been controlled by senior Stasi officers. They would have sought to conceal the true basis for their "curiosity", as representing, for instance, the local council, the military or the tax office in order to get their target-interlocutors talking. Details of these AKPs, including the extent of their willingness to talk, were documented in the Stasi files. Sample-based analysis of these Stasi records in Rostock and Saalfeld shows that approximately 18% and 5.9% of the populations, respectively, were assessed as AKPs who were, for the most part, ready to talk. That means that in these places the IMs were outnumbered many times over by these AKPs. In Karl-Marx-Stadt (the name of which has since reverted to Chemnitz) the Stasi had contacts with people they defined as "good people" ("gute Menschen"), people ready to be helpful to them. In business and workplaces, state institutions and social organisations, the Stasi worked with "official" partners. Usually these were people in key positions, which normally meant leadership positions. Most frequently these were in workplaces, where security issues, mostly personnel issues could be clarified. These "official" partners were expected not merely to provide information, but also to accept advice from them, and to respect instructions to replace personnel. These contacts could not be considered "unofficial" but they mostly operated in an informal manner. Conversations with "official" Stasi partners could fatefully affect peoples' lives, leading to career difficulties or travel restrictions. The Stasi preferred "official" partners to be members of the nomenklatura. These were people with close ties to the ruling SED (party), and they were the people who exercised the real power in the East German dictatorship.

=== Concentration and geographical distribution ===
The concentration of Informal collaborators varied considerably, ranging from about one IM for every 80 of the population up to about 160. The greatest concentrations were in Cottbus, Schwerin and Magdeburg while the lowest were in Berlin, Halle and Leipzig.

The IM network was almost exclusively a domestic operation. Little information survives on IM activities abroad. It is estimated that the Stasi employed 3,000 (including HVA agents) of these informants in West Germany, and between 300 and 400 in other western countries. During the entire period of the Stasi's existence it is estimated that approximately 12,000 West Germans worked for the Stasi. Many of these were former East Germans whom the Stasi mandated to relocate to the west. The majority of these IMs were nevertheless people born in West Germany who worked for the Stasi because their political sympathies favoured the German Democratic Republic (East Germany).

=== Genders, party affiliation and age profiles ===
IMs were predominantly male (83% in East Germany and 73% in West Germany). Most were members of the ruling East German SED (roughly 5% of the party's members were also IMs).

The 25–40 age group was particularly well represented (between 30 and 40% of IMs fell within this age range as compared with only 24% in the population as a whole), with the under-25s and those of pensionable age correspondingly under represented.

== Activities ==
The information collected by the IMs generally involved reports on the behaviour of people from their domestic or work environments. The IMs frequently spied on close friends and family members. After 1989 and the ensuing opening up of the Stasi records, this often led to the terminations of friendships and marriages. Some of the IMs did what they did out of political conviction: others acted in return for favours or because they were put under pressure.

An informal collaborator provided reports, on an average, for between six and ten years, but in some cases might produce surveillance reports for much longer.

Internally, differentiations between different categories of Informal Collaborators was important. There were big differences between a GMS, an IMB and an IMS.

Under the generalised term Informal Collaborator (IM) information gathering was also undertaken by people who were not listed as IMs. As an example, that could involve people who simply lived or worked as neighbours of objects deemed relevant to national safety. Additionally, people identified by the Stasi as persistent political adversaries ("Feindlich-negative Personen"), were – each according to his/her importance – subject to surveillance by several IMs recruited for the purpose from among their personal contacts.

== Categories ==
From 1957 to 1989 the East German Minister for State Security was Erich Mielke. In Guideline 1/79, which was in effect between 1980 and 1989, Mielke classified the work of the Informal Collaborators as follows:

- Unofficial collaborator with special tasks (IMA / Inoffizieller Mitarbeiter mit besonderen Aufgaben)

IMAs were employed for "offensive" measures in the "Operations region" ("Operationsgebiet"). The "Operations region" meant West Germany. IMA "offensive" measures involved contacts with western journalists in order to plant stories in western media. The work involved both one-time actions and long-running projects. By 1989 the Stasi were working with approximately 16 West German IMAs.

- Unofficial collaborator with enemy-connections and for the immediate processing of persons suspected of hostile activity (IMB / Inoffizieller Mitarbeiter der Abwehr mit Feindverbindung bzw. zur unmittelbaren Bearbeitung im Verdacht der Feindtätigkeit stehender Personen)

IMBs were particularly important IMs. They enjoyed the confidence of the Stasi, and they also had direct contacts with people classified by the Stasi as hostile (Feindlich-negative Personen). They had direct involvement with long-running work on developing the relevant Operativer Vorgang (Procedures Manual).
Some IMBs were permitted to travel outside the Eastern Bloc in order to observe or investigate people or objects. For these objectives they were also provided with secret service materials and foreign currency. The Stasi were particularly interested in opposition groups and church officials, and were keen to recruit, as IMBs, any East German citizens who had relationships with such people in countries outside the Eastern Bloc. The Stasi also favoured, as IMBs, people who had kinship connections to employees of state organisations in West Germany such as the Police service and security services. Where East Germans with such kinship connections became known to the Stasi, attempts were made, sometimes using untoward pressure, to recruit them as IMBs.
The category of Informal Collaborators classed as IMBs came about from the merger, in 1980, of two other categories, the IMFs and the IMVs Before 1968 they were known, more simply, as "Secret Collaborators" (GMs / "Geheime Mitarbeiter"). On 31 December 1987 the Stasis were working with more than 3,955 IMBs.

- Unofficial collaborator on special operations (IME / Inoffizieller Mitarbeiter im besonderen Einsatz)

IMEs were Informal Collaborators used by the Stasi for specialist missions. They were people with unusual skills, such as handwriting experts or toxicologists, and they were used for surveillance and investigations in key locations. At universities and academies, for example, they could monitor trends in research and development, and highlight administrative shortcomings. Before 1968 they were known as "Secret Collaborators in specialist operations" (GMEs / "Geheime Mitarbeiter im besonderen Einsatz"). In June 1988 the Stasis were listing 7,375 IMEs.

- Unofficial collaborator for Protection from Conspiracies and Subversive groupings (IMK / Inoffizieller Mitarbeiter zur Sicherung der Konspiration und des Verbindungswesens)

IMKs were used by the Stasi for various logistical assignments. There were different types of IMK, depending on the nature of their tasks. Those who set up safe houses, special rooms or objects, were known as IMK/KWs or IMK/KOs. Those providing the Stasi with undercover addresses or undercover telephones were known as IMK/DAs or IMK/DTs IMs providing logistical services on behalf of other East German security organisations are identified in the files with the initials IMK/S. In 1989 the Stasi was working with approximately 30,500 IMKs. In most cases these were people who themselves passed on only small amounts of information to the Stasi but who were valued and trusted because of their importance in the context of conspiracies.

- Unofficial collaborator for Political-operative Penetration and for Protection of Responsibility areas (IMS / Inoffizieller Mitarbeiter zur politisch-operativen Durchdringung und Sicherung des Verantwortungsbereiches)

IMSs were people engaged in security-related areas (such as businesses, social institutions, research and training facilities or governmental institutions) who routinely or regularly reported on other peoples' behaviour. The idea was to identify and prevent suspicious actions as early as possible, and to contribute more generally to domestic security in their areas of responsibility. Before 1968 IMSs were generally known simply by the label "Secret informant" (GI / "Geheimer Informator "). This was the largest of the categories in Informal Collaborator under Mielke's classification system, with 93,600 listed by the Stasi in 1989. Other sources indicate that during the 1980s the proportion of IMs in the IMS category was even higher, at 85%.

- (GMS / Gesellschaftliche Mitarbeiter für Sicherheit)

GMSs were people active in leading positions in the economy and administration, and were often high-profile supporters of the state and of the party. They were used for information retrieval, and might be able, behind the scenes, to ease the workload of other classes of IM. By and large they did not participate directly in operations involving "enemy-negative persons" ("feindlich-negativer Personen"). By the end there were about 33,300 GMSs. Although the GMs partly worked like other classes of IM, the Stasi records did not classify them with the other IMs: GMS operations were conducted according to a separate set of guidelines. Because of this, in disputes over the numbers of IMs, the historian Ilko-Sascha Kowalczuk contends that informants in the GMS category should not be counted as IMs.

- Leading IM (FIM / Führungs-IM)

Reliable IMs with leadership qualities and "operational experience" could, on behalf of the Stasi - under the leadership and direction of a Stasi operational officer" lead and instruct at most between three and five IMs or GMSs. Their mandate and terms often enabled them to operate with a large measure of independence. Until 1968 they were designated Senior Secret Informers (GHI / Geheime Hauptinformatoren). In June 1988 there were 4,657 of them. In addition the HVA (foreign intelligence) had 26 based in West Germany. There were also around 3,500 professional people in a group described as High-level IM leaders (HFIM / "Hauptamtlichen Führungs-IM ") who appeared to be working in positions of responsibility, but without any formally defined work or military contractual relationship, who performed duties on behalf of, and who were paid by, the Stasi. After 1986 these people are listed with the other Stasi employees.

- IM candidate and probationary IM (IM-Kandidat/IM-Vorlauf)

An individual keen to become an informal collaborator was entered into a preliminary process, and who had started to undertake information gathering conversations, but had not yet been recruited, was listed in the Stasi files as a "probationary IM" ("Vorlauf-IM"/ VL-IM or V-IM ). In this situation a centrally administered IM preliminary programme was followed. Provided the probationary phase was successfully completed, the candidate made a declaration of agreement and became a regular Informal Collaborator (IM). Otherwise the application was cancelled and, under most circumstances, simply archived.

== Historical appraisals ==
An aspect of the establishment, in October 1990, of the Federal Commission for the Stasi Records (BStU) was the inclusion, intentionally, of numerous former senior Stasi employees. However, at the same time large numbers of unrecognized Informal Collaborators were also recruited. This was possible because the vetting of people recruited to the BStU for evidence of previous Stasi collaboration was extremely lax – far more so than in respect of people recruited to other institutions. For example, the first director of the BStU's Schwerin branch stated publicly: "We had agreed that each one should be self-checking". In 1998 it turned out that a former Stasi IM (identified in Der Spiegel as "IM Delia") had up to that point been in the director of the BStU's Schwerin branch.

A recurring feature of the analysis of the role of Informal Collaborators in the German Democratic Republic has been a succession of legal actions undertaken against authors in order to try to prevent the naming of former IMs. The courts have sometimes responded with mutually contradictory judgements. A new development came in 2010 with the attempt, initially successful, but which was rejected on appeal, of a former Stasi spy in Erfurt to prevent his name appearing on a website.

== Moral appraisals ==
The great range of circumstances that led to collaboration with the Stasi makes any overall moral evaluation of the spying activities extremely difficult. There were those that volunteered willingly and without moral scruples to pass detailed reports to the Stasi out of selfish motives, from self-regard, or from the urge to exercise power over others. Others collaborated with the Stasi out of a sincerely held sense of duty that the GDR was the better Germany and that it must be defended from the assaults of its enemies. Others were to a lesser or greater extent themselves victims of state persecution and had been broken or blackmailed into collaboration. Many informants believed that they could protect friends or relations by passing on only positive information about them, while others thought that provided they reported nothing suspicious or otherwise punishable, then no harm would be done by providing the Stasi with reports. These failed to accept that the Stasi could use apparently innocuous information to support their covert operations and interrogations.

A further problem in any moral evaluation is presented by the extent to which information from informal collaborators was also used for combating non-political criminality. Moral judgements on collaboration involving criminal police who belonged to the Stasi need to be considered on a case by case basis, according to individual circumstances.

A belief has gained traction that any informal collaborator (IM) who refused the Stasi further collaboration and extracted himself (in the now outdated Stasi jargon of the time "sich dekonspirierte") from a role as an IM need have no fear of serious consequences for his life, and could in this way safely cut himself off from communication with the Stasi. This is untrue. Furthermore, even people who declared unequivocally that they were not available for spying activities could nevertheless, over the years, find themselves exposed to high-pressure "recruitment" tactics. It was not uncommon for an IM trying to break out of a collaborative relationship with the Stasi to find his employment opportunities destroyed. The Stasi would often identify refusal to collaborate, using another jargon term, as "enemy-negative conduct" ("feindlich-negative Haltung"), which frequently resulted in what they termed "Zersetzungsmaßnahmen", a term for which no very direct English translation is available, but for one form of which a definition has been provided that begins:

"a systematic degradation of reputation, image, and prestige in a database on one part true, verifiable and degrading, and on the other part false, plausible, irrefutable, and always degrading; a systematic organization of social and professional failures for demolishing the self-confidence of the individual...".

== See also ==
- Category:East German spies
- Category:Stasi officers
- Committees for the Defense of the Revolution
- Federal Commission for the Stasi Records
- Zersetzung
- Polish equivalent

== Reading list ==
- Ilko-Sascha Kowalczuk: Stasi konkret. Überwachung und Repression in der DDR. Beck, München 2013, ISBN 978-3-406-63838-1
- Helmut Müller-Enbergs: Die inoffiziellen Mitarbeiter. In: BStU: Anatomie der Staatssicherheit – Geschichte, Struktur, Methoden. Berlin 2008, S. 35–38,
- Helmut Müller-Enbergs (Hrsg.): Inoffizielle Mitarbeiter des Ministeriums für Staatssicherheit. Teil 1: Richtlinien und Durchführungsbestimmungen. Ch. Links Verlag, Berlin 1996, ISBN 3-86153-101-1.
- Helmut Müller-Enbergs (Hrsg.): Inoffizielle Mitarbeiter des Ministeriums für Staatssicherheit. Teil 2: Anleitung für die Arbeit mit Agenten, Kundschaftern und Spionen in der Bundesrepublik Deutschland. Ch. Links Verlag, Berlin 1998, ISBN 3-86153-145-3.
- Helmut Müller-Enbergs (Hrsg.): Inoffizielle Mitarbeiter des Ministeriums für Staatssicherheit. Teil 3: Statistiken. (Mitarbeit Susanne Muhle) Ch. Links Verlag, Berlin 2008, ISBN 978-3-86153-441-9. auf Google Books
- Jörn Mothes, Gundula Fienbork u.a. (Hrsg.): Beschädigte Seelen. DDR-Jugend und Staatssicherheit. Edition Temmen, Rostock 1996, ISBN 3-86108-881-9.
- Francesca Weil: Zielgruppe Ärzteschaft. Ärzte als inoffizielle Mitarbeiter des Ministeriums für Staatssicherheit der DDR. V & R Unipress, Göttingen 2008, ISBN 3-89971-423-7. (=Hannah-Arendt-Institut für Totalitarismusforschung: Berichte und Studien, Nr. 54)
