= Aleksander Radler =

- Education: Humboldt University of Berlin; University of Jena; University of Lund
- Occupations: theologian and former unofficial Stasi employee
- Theological work
- Tradition or movement: Lutheran

Aleksander Radler (born May 17, 1944) is an Austrian-Swedish Lutheran theologian and former unofficial employee of the East German Ministry of State Security (Stasi).

== Life ==
Radler was born in Posen (now Poznań in Poland) and grew up in the German Democratic Republic, but retained Austrian citizenship and was therefore able to travel freely to and from the West. In 1965, he was recruited by the Stasi as a "secret agent" and was assigned the alias IM "Thomas". He studied Protestant theology at the Humboldt University of Berlin and later at the University of Jena, and regularly reported on contacts he made there. In July 1968, he revealed to his Stasi superiors the names of several fellow students who had entrusted to him letters to carry to West Berlin. As a result, six students were sentenced to between 2 and 3 3/4 years in prison for "planned flight from the Republic" or "subversive acts" (one of the students wrote that he was blackmailed for "active anti-communist work in an illegal student organization"). Two of them committed suicide in prison. Through his IM activities about 23 young people were prosecuted for a total of 50 years of detention. To protect Radler's identity, the Stasi permitted him to continue his studies in Sweden, but continued to support him financially and employ him as an informer. After several years he was promoted to the position of IMB ("unofficial defence employee with enemy connection or for immediate processing suspected of enemy activity").

Radler completed his doctoral studies in theology at the University of Lund in 1977 with a thesis on the work of Friedrich Schleiermacher. From 1982 to 1985 he was a professor at Åbo Akademi University in Finland. In 1988, he habilitated with an examination on the work of Erik Gustaf Geijer. In October of the same year, he was appointed professor of theology at the University of Jena with the support of the Stasi. In 1991, he took up a new position as professor of Systematic Ecumenical Theology and Ethics at the Martin Luther University of Halle-Wittenberg. In 1994, the Berlin pastor Dietmar Linke made public evidence of Radler's activity as a Stasi informant. Shortly thereafter in 1995, Radler gave up his professorship and returned to Sweden, where he became kyrkoherde (chief pastor) in Burträsk. In addition, he was a member of the parish council for the Christian Democrats and associate professor at Umeå University. In 2011, the Swedish historian Birgitta Almgren described his case in her book Inte bara spioner ... Stasi-infiltration i Sverige under kalla kriget ("Not just spies ... Stasi infiltration in Sweden during the Cold War") without revealing his name. Finally in the spring of 2012, the newspaper Expressen published a story identifying IM "Thomas" with Aleksander Radler. He initially denied culpability but resigned his parish office later that year after the Swedish Church launched an investigation into his case.

On September 20, 2013, Radler confessed that he had been a spy for the Stasi in an open letter published in Swedish Christian newspaper, Dagen.

On November 23, 2014, MDR Fernsehen screened the hour-long documentary Der Stasimann in Schweden ("The Stasi Man in Sweden") by Ryszard Solarz about Radler and his work for the Stasi. Radler was not available for an interview for this film.

On December 4, 2014, Swedish national television (SVT) aired the documentary Spionen som hamnade i kylan (EN: the spy who found himself in the cold) about Radler’s double-life.

== Publications ==
- Religion und kirchliche Wirklichkeit. Eine rezeptionsgeschichtliche Untersuchung des Schleiermacherbildes in der schwedischen Theologie. (Studia theologica Lundensia 36). Liber/Gleerup, Lund 1977. ISBN 91-40-04459-9.
- Idéhistoriska perspektiv: från Augustinus till Luther : kursbok i kristendomens historia. Lund Univ., Teol. inst. 1984.
- Kursbok i kristendomens historia: teologihistoriska perspektiv. Lund Univ., Teologiska inst. 1985.
- Kristen idéhistoria: kursbok i kristendomens historia. Lund Univ., Teologiska inst. 1988.
- Peregrinatio religiosa: Studien zum Religionsbegriff in der schwedischen Romantik. Teil 1: Die christliche Persönlichkeitsphilosophie Erik Gustaf Geijers (Bibliotheca historico-ecclesiastica Lundensis 18). Lund Univ. Press, Lund 1988.
- (with Bengt Hägglund, Sven-Oscar Berglund, Joachim Heubach): Luther und Barth (Veröffentlichungen der Luther-Akademie Ratzeburg 13). Martin-Luther-Verlag, Erlangen 1989. ISBN 3-87513-065-0.
- (with Udo Kern, Annegret Freund): Tragende Tradition: Festschrift für Martin Seils zum 65. Geburtstag. Lang, Frankfurt am Main 1992. ISBN 3-631-44992-5.
- Kristen dogmatik. Studentlitteratur, Lund 2006. ISBN 91-44-32311-5.
