= Lilli Pöttrich =

German lawyer (born 1954)

- Born: Lilli Margarethe Pöttrich; 3 November 1954 (age 71); Wiesbaden, West Germany
- Education: Frankfurt; Cologne
- Occupations: lawyer; spy
- Political party: SPD; SED

Lilli Pöttrich (born 3 November 1954) is a German lawyer. Under the IM cover-name "Angelika" she served as an agent of the "Hauptverwaltung Aufklärung" / HVA, the foreign intelligence branch of the East German Ministry for State Security (Stasi).

== Life ==
Lilli Margarethe Pöttrich was born in Wiesbaden, the elder of her parents' two daughters. Raimund Pöttrich, her father, was a port worker and trades-union activist in Düsseldorf-Eller and then in Düsseldorf-Benrath, where she attended a Roman Catholic primary school. She moved on to the nearby Annette von Droste Hülshoff Gymnasium (secondary school) where she completed her school final exams (Abitur) in 1973. While still at school, she was sufficiently impressed by the Ostpolitik strategy being pursued by the West German chancellor, Willy Brandt, to join his political party, the centre-left Social Democratic Party ("Sozialdemokratische Partei Deutschlands" / SPD). Passing the Abitur opened the way to a university level education and Pöttrich progressed to Frankfurt University where she started work on her Law degree.

Early on during her university career she became a member of the recently formed "Socialist University Association" ("Sozialistischer Hochschulbund" / SHB), an activist grouping closely aligned to the (West German) SPD. It was as an SHB delegate that she participated in a student visit to Potsdam in East Germany, at the invitation of the FDJ ("Free German Youth" "Freie Deutsche Jugend"). The FDJ was the youth wing of East Germany's ruling Socialist Unity Party ("Sozialistische Einheitspartei Deutschlands" / SED). During this visit officials of the East German Ministry for State Security (MfS / Stasi) had the opportunity to evaluate Pöttrich's political views and to identify her as someone who might be willing and able to work for them. They were right. Since Pöttrich was a West German citizen, resident in West Germany, the ministry department to which she was of particular interest was the "Hauptverwaltung Aufklärung" / HVA, described as the ministry's "foreign intelligence services" but which, because of the shared language and cultural histories and the opportunities these threw up, concentrated its activities almost exclusively on West Germany. No one approached the twenty-year-old law student on behalf of the ministry during her visit to Potsdam, however.

Soon after returning to Frankfurt, Pöttrich received a visit from two East Germans. They were both Stasi collaborators, though it is not clear whether this aspect was spelt out at the time. They invited Pöttrich to become a member of an institution called the "Institut fur Imperialismusforsching" ("Institute for Research into Imperialism"). The proposition was contextualised as a form of opinion polling, and they invited her to visit East Berlin in order to progress their "interesting discussion" further. In Autumn 1975, she undertook her next trip to East Germany, where she met a man called Rüdi, who would later become her principal point of contact with her eastern spymasters. Conversation turned to espionage: it became apparent that her East German visitors earlier in the year had been conducting an unannounced "job interview".

In January/February 1976, she formally joined the service during a visit to Strausberg in East Germany. She signed the standard secret service declaration of duty/obligation ("Verpflichtungserklärung") and chose her cover name: Angelika. Later that year, on the request of her new bosses, she switched from Frankfurt to the University of Cologne, conveniently half an hour down-river from Bonn, which at that time was West Germany's political and administrative capital. At Cologne, in parallel with her student studies, she compiled reports on the academic and social milieu. Using the tried and tested HVA communications techniques in which she had by now been schooled, she passed these to her handlers. She had regular meetings with secret service contacts during this time, in order to hand over her reports in the form of micro-film documents, and to receive operational instructions. In 1981, Pöttrich passed her level one national law exams accompanied by a "voll befriedigend" commendation. In December of that year, armed with a false passport, she travelled via Copenhagen to Schöneiche in the German Democratic Republic (East Germany) where she met with a number of high-ranking officers, including Ralf-Peter "Rüdi" Devaux. A series of further clandestine meetings would follow in various foreign locations.

It is clear that by this time Pöttrich was identifying with the GDR (East Germany). She even took East German citizenship. She joined the country's ruling SED (party) and, together with high-level MfS officers, mapped out a suitable long-term espionage strategy for herself. Their agreed first objective was that she should join the West German diplomatic service at the higher civil service grade ("Höherer Dienst"). That was achieved in 1982. In April 1983, she embarked on a traineeship in Bonn for Foreign Ministry work as a diplomatic attachée. She came through any necessary security checks without problems. In 1986, the West German authorities gave her a lifelong employment contract. The diplomatic career that followed took her first to Bangladesh and then, in December 1988, to the German embassy in Paris. In Paris, she worked as the deputy to the official in charge of the so-called "CoCom" section. That gave her access to key reports and minutes of meetings of the Coordinating Committee for Multilateral Export Controls. This international committee's principal purpose was to prevent the export of western technologies - especially military technologies - to countries under close Soviet influence or control. She prepared reports on these and passed them to her handlers.

As the changes which led, in March 1990, to the end of the one-party dictatorship in East Germany unfolded, Pöttrich initially continued with her work for the eastern intelligence services. She had participated in more than sixty meetings with contacts from the East German intelligence services, and that the last of these meetings took place in Aachen in February 1990. She continued to work for the West German diplomatic service till 1 December 1993 when she was unmasked and arrested. Information about her work for the HVA appears to have reached the authorities from a copy of the so-called Rosenholz files, although details on this point are unclear. At the time of her arrest Lilli Pöttrich had recently been promoted to the rank of a senior councillor ("Vortragenden Legationsrätin") and appointed as head of the German consulate in Sibiu (formerly Hermannstadt), but she was arrested before she could take up this new appointment, and as a result of her arrest she was dismissed from public office.

On 28 April 1995 the district high court in Düsseldorf sentenced Pöttrich to two years in jail for serious espionage offences, but the sentence was suspended, so that subject to various conditions she remained at liberty. Conviction was accompanied by a ban on working as a lawyer, but after this expired she returned to the profession, setting up in practice in Düsseldorf. She has been far more willing to speak freely to journalists and researchers about her espionage for East Germany than most of those who were involved in the HVA networks, although that does not preclude a certain studied vagueness on several aspects of those experiences.

== Key statistics (selection) ==
According to information in the Sira database created, originally, by the HVA, between February 1984 and November 1986 Lilli Pöttrich delivered 38 important reports to her spymasters, of which 34 were considered worth passing on to the Soviet KGB (КГБ / security service). Out of 29 documents from her that were retained in the files of Department I/3 at the HVA, 17 were classed as "valuable" ("wertvoll") and one as "very valuable" ("sehr wertvoll"). This last comprised extracts from a discussion between foreign ministers Hans-Dietrich Genscher and George P. Shultz in December 1985.
