= Gesellschaft zur Rechtlichen und Humanitären Unterstützung =

Voluntary association

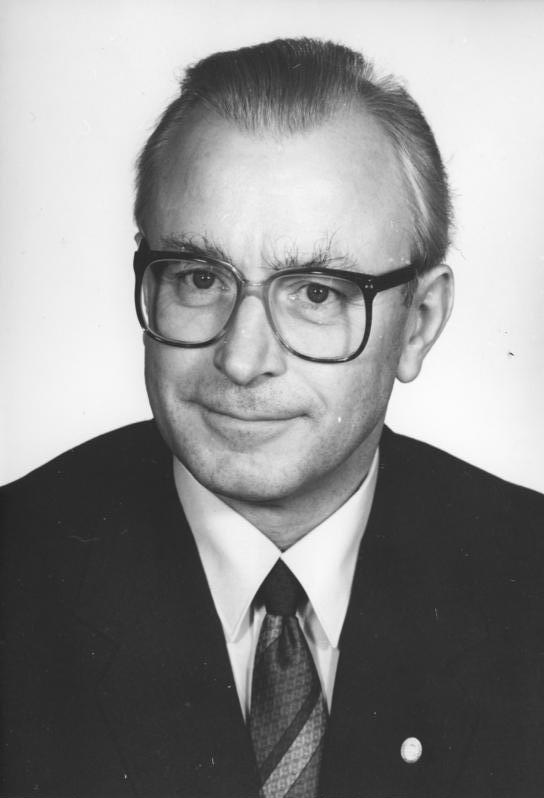
The last head of the Stasi, Wolfgang Schwanitz

The Gesellschaft zur Rechtlichen und Humanitären Unterstützung (GRH; English: Society for Legal and Humanitarian Assistance) is a German historical negationist organisation consisting of former employees of the East German secret police, the Stasi.

It was led by the last Stasi chief, Wolfgang Schwanitz until his death in 2022.

== History ==
In Germany the organisation is best known for its attempt to portray the Stasi in a positive light and for trivializing or denying the political repression in East Germany. It has become widely known in Germany for massively disturbing memorial ceremonies or other forms of public events relating to political repression in East Germany.

GRH has also been accused of harassing victims of the East German regime, journalists, and politicians. GRH has been described by historian Hubertus Knabe, the Director of the Berlin-Hohenschönhausen Memorial, as an "aid association for state criminals."

== See also ==
- HIAG (Hilfsgemeinschaft auf Gegenseitigkeit der Angehörigen der ehemaligen Waffen-SS) — A similar organization advocating for former Waffen-SS personnel
