= Gerhart Hass =

German historian (1931–2008)

Gerhart Hass (29 March 1931 – 3 May 2008) was a German historian. His approach reflected the Marxist prism through which East Germany's historical establishment viewed their subject. He worked at the History Institute, part of the Berlin based (East) German Academy of Sciences and Humanities, where from 1974 he was a professor. His work concentrated on the History of Fascism in Europe and the Second World War.

== Life ==
Gerhart Hass was born in Berlin roughly two years before the Nazis took power and transformed Germany into a one-party dictatorship. By the time he left school in 1949 half of Berlin and a large area surrounding the city were being administered as the Soviet occupation zone. He joined the Free German Youth ("Freie Deutsche Jugend" / FDJ), becoming a district secretary for what was in effect the youth wing of the ruling party in what was relaunched, in October of that year, as the German Democratic Republic, a new kind of one-party dictatorship. The next year Hass transferred to Berlin's Humboldt University and embarked on a degree course in History. After a year, however, in 1951 he was recommended for a transfer abroad. For five years he studied history at the Zhdanov University in Leningrad (as the Saint Petersburg State University was then known), and it was from Leningrad that he emerged in 1956 with a History Degree.

During 1956/57 Hass was employed in a support capacity at the East German Ministry for Foreign Affairs. In 1957 he started work as a research assistant - later becoming a research team leader - in the "1917-1945" department at the Institute for History at the (East) German Academy of Sciences and Humanities ("Deutsche Akademie der Wissenschaften zu Berlin"). By 1962 he had also become an "extraordinary academic aspirant" ("außerplanmäßige wissenschaftliche Aspirantur"), which in Soviet bloc countries was a step along the way to a career in the higher reaches of the academic hierarchy. He received his doctorate in April 1962 from Halle University. His dissertation was a study of "the development of differences between American and German imperialisms on the eve of the Second World War (1938–1939)": his supervisors for the work were Leo Stern and Werner Basler.

In 1965 Hass took on leadership of the research group "Fascism and the Second World War". His higher level doctorate ("Promotion B") was received in 1970 in return for a piece of work on "The Second World War in the confrontation between both social systems". Between 1974 and 1991 Hass held a professorship at the (East) German Academy of Sciences and Humanities. He contributed to a vast project on "Germany in the Second World War", which covered domestic policy, the war economy, anti-fascist resistance, foreign policy and policy in respect of occupied territories. The project addressed German policy on these matters through the interpretational prism of Lenin's Theory of Imperialism and of Dimitrov's thesis of fascism. A valuable by-product was volumes of suitably edited documents.

Hass was secretary to the German section of the Commission of East German and Soviet Historians. After reunification, from 1991 till May 1995 he worked under the framework of the Academic Integration Programme of Coordination and Reconstruction Initiatives in Berlin.

It later transpired that in 1965 Gerhart Hass signed an agreement with the Ministry for State Security whereby he became an Informal collaborator ("inoffizieller Mitarbeiter" / IM), providing information in the context of the ministry's vast surveillance programme. The files show his cover name as "IM Rolf". The historian Martin Sabrow asserts that Hass was a type of "expert collaborator" operating only in a peripheral manner, but called in for consultation if an operation had gone wrong. One attraction of providing information to the Stasi for ambitious professional people was the possibility of gaining increased influence in the work place. It was also seen as a way to win the trust of the authorities and thereby to improve one's chances of obtaining permission to visit the west.

In 1985 Hass was deprived of his party membership after falling into arrears with his party contributions. The Ministry for State Security also ended relations with him in 1985.

== Publications ==
- with Siegfried Thomas: Unser Geschichtsstudium an der Leningrader Universität. In: Zeitschrift für Geschichtswissenschaft 2 (1954), pp. 162–166.
- with Stefan Doernberg (editor-compiler): Der Deutsche Imperialismus und der zweite Weltkrieg…. Rütten und Loening, Berlin 1960.
- Der komische Krieg in Westeuropa, September 1939 bis Mai 1940. Deutscher Militärverlag, Berlin 1961.
- Ostlandreiter ohne Chance. Beiträge zur Geschichte des faschistischen Überfalls auf die Sowjetunion. Akademie-Verl., Berlin 1963.
- Von München bis Pearl Harbor. Zur Geschichte der deutsch-amerikanischen Beziehungen 1938-1941. Akademie-Verlag, Berlin 1965.
- with Peter Hoffmann: Geschichte der internationalen Beziehungen. Deutscher Verl. d. Wissenschaften VEB, Berlin 1965.
- with Dietrich Eichholtz: Zu den Ursachen des zweiten Weltkrieges und den Kriegszielen des deutschen Imperialismus. In: Zeitschrift für Geschichtswissenschaft 15, Nr. 7 (1967), pp. 1148–1170.
- mit Wolfgang Bleyer et al. (Hrsg.): Deutschland von 1939 bis 1945. Deutschland während des zweiten Weltkrieges. 1sr edition. Deutscher Verlag der Wissenschaften, Berlin 1969.
- with Karl Obermann (editor-compiler): Biographisches Lexikon zur deutschen Geschichte. 2. Auflage. Deutscher Verl. d. Wiss, Berlin 1970.
- with Wolfgang Schumann (editor-compiler): Deutschland im ersten Weltkrieg. 2. Auflage. Akademie der Wissenschaften der DDR, Berlin 1970.
- with Karl Drechsler und Hans Dress: Europapläne des deutschen Imperialismus im zweiten Weltkrieg. In: Zeitschrift für Geschichtswissenschaft 19, Nr. 7 (1971), pp. 916–931.
- with Wolfgang Schumann (editor-compiler): Anatomie der Aggression;. Neue Dokumente zu den Kriegszielen des faschistischen deutschen Imperialismus im zweiten Weltkrieg. Deutscher Verlag der Wissenschaften, Berlin 1972.
- with Wolfgang Schumann und Karl Drechsler (editor-compiler): Deutschland im zweiten Weltkrieg. Von einem Autorenkollektiv unter Leitung von Wolfgang Schumann [et al. hrsg. von der] Akademie der Wissenschaften der DDR, Zentralinstitut fuer Geschichte in Zusammenarbeit mit dem Militaergeschichtlichen Institut der DDR [und der] Institut fuer Marxismus- Leninismus beim ZK der SED. Akademie Verl., Berlin 1974-1985.
- Hermann Göring. Der Reichstag brennt. In: Sturz ins Dritte Reich : histor. Miniaturen u. Porträts 1933/35. 1983, pp. 102–108.
- Bankrott der Münchener Politik. Die Zerschlagung der Tschechoslowakei 1939. Dt. Verl. der Wiss, Berlin 1988, ISBN 3326003226.
- Münchner Diktat 1938. Komplott zum Krieg. Dietz, Berlin 1988, ISBN 9783320010676.
- 23. August 1939. Der Hitler-Stalin-Pakt; Dokumentation. Dietz Verl, Berlin 1990, ISBN 3-320-01555-9
- with Dietrich Eichholtz, Wolfgang Wippermann: Faschismus und Rassismus. Kontroversen um Ideologie und Opfer. Berlin 1992, ISBN 3-050-01852-6
- Weltmachtziele – Europastrategie – Besatzungspolitik. Aspekte einer vergleichenden Okkupationsforschung. In: Zeitschrift für Sozialgeschichte 7 (1992), Nr. 2, pp. 12–30
- Zum Russlandbild der SS. In: Hans-Erich Volkmann (editor-compiler): Das Russlandbild im Dritten Reich. Köln [u. a.] 1994, ISBN 3-412-15793-7, pp. 201–224.
- with Klaus Scheel: Europa unterm Hakenkreuz. Okkupation und Kollaboration. In: Zeitschrift für Geschichtswissenschaft 40 (1992), pp. 1063–1065.
- Möglichkeiten und Grenzen vergleichender Betrachtung der Geschichte des Zweiten Weltkrieges. Mobilisierung und Radikalisierung. In: Zeitschrift für Geschichtswissenschaft 42 (1994), pp. 56–59.
- Joachim von Ribbentrop. "… zwischen den Mahlsteinen der Weltgeschichte zerieben". In: Stufen zum Galgen. 1999, pp. 55–87.
- Entgegnung. In: 1999 : Zeitschrift für Sozialgeschichte des 20. und 21. Jahrhunderts.15, Nr. 2 (2000), pp. 157–163.
- Hitlers Krieg und Stalins Absichten. Der 22. Juni 1941: politische, soziale und militärische Hintergründe der Konfrontation zwischen Nationalsozialismus und Stalinismus. In: Zeitschrift für Geschichtswissenschaft 48 (2000), pp. 257–260. ISSN 0044-2828
- Der Krieg vor dem Krieg. Politik und Ökonomik der "friedlichen" Aggressionen Deutschland 1938/39. In: Bulletin für Faschismus- und Weltkriegsforschung : wissenschaftliche Halbjahresschrift.Nr. 19 2002, pp. 70–74.
- Deutsche Besatzungspolitik im Leningrader Gebiet 1941 - 1944. In: "Wir sind die Herren dieses Landes" : Ursachen, Verlauf und Folgen des deutschen Überfalls auf die Sowjetunion. 2002, pp. 64–81.
- Leben, Sterben und Überleben im belagerten Leningrad (1941-1944). In: Zeitschrift für Geschichtswissenschaft (2002).
- Naziverbrechen vor DDR-Gerichten. Eine Edition. Ed. Organon, Berlin 2002.
- Kulturelle "Gleichschaltung" im faschistischen Deutschland als Teil der Kriegsvorbereitung und Wiederaufrüstung. In: Bulletin für Faschismus- und Weltkriegsforschung : wissenschaftliche Halbjahresschrift.Nr. 24 2005, pp. 58–78.
- Die deutsche Historiografie über die Belagerung Leningrads (1941-1944). In: Zeitschrift für Geschichtswissenschaft 54, Nr. 2 (2006), pp. 139–162. ISSN 1434-5781
- Das deutsche Exil in der Sowjetunion 1933-1945. In: Handbuch zum Widerstand gegen Nationalsozialismus und Faschismus in Europa 1933/39 bis 1945. 2011, pp. 311–323. ISBN 3-598-11767-1
