= Rainer Rupp =

East German spy

Rainer Rupp (born September 21, 1945 in Saarlouis, Germany) is a former top spy who worked under the codenames Mosel and later Topaz for the East German intelligence service HVA (General Reconnaissance Administration) in the NATO headquarters in Brussels from 1977 until 1989, releasing documents of the highest importance (Cosmic Top Secret) to the Eastern Bloc.

== Biography ==
Rupp grew up in West Germany with strong leftist political leanings. In 1968, as a student in Mainz, employment as a spy for the GDR was suggested to him, and he agreed out of conviction. He continued his studies in Brussels, was trained as a spy in East Berlin and was hired by NATO in 1977. He rose quickly in the ranks and provided photographs of some 10,000 pages to his controllers, including the precise location plans for the deployment of cruise missiles and Pershing II missiles in Western Europe, as well as the central MC 161 document which summarized the NATO strategy as well as NATO's analysis of the Warsaw Pact and its intentions. These documents were promptly transferred to the KGB.

He would photograph documents in his office, or take them home and photograph them in his wine cellar. He met contact persons all over Europe and received instructions via number stations, i.e. radio programs broadcasting messages encrypted as number sequences. His British wife knew about his activities and tried to persuade him to stop. He later said "At the time I did it, I believed it to be my moral duty."

NATO did not have any knowledge of the existence of Topaz until GDR officer Heinz Busch defected in 1990. Busch however did not know the identity of Topaz. Several meetings of the secret services of a number of countries ensued with the aim of identifying Topaz, who took part in some of those meetings. With the help of the Rosenholz files that had fallen into the hands of the CIA after the dissolution of the GDR, Rupp was caught in 1993 while on holiday in Germany. He confessed and received a prison sentence of 12 years in 1994. He was released early in July 2000. Rupp became a member of the PDS and served temporarily as an advisor in regard to issues of security and foreign policy; he quit the party, however, in 2003.

== Averted atomic war claim ==
Rupp claims that his activities may have averted a nuclear war in the fall of 1983, a claim that is not entirely unfounded according to American experts. In an interview for the Channel 4 programme "1983: The Brink of Apocalypse" about exercise Able Archer 83, broadcast in the UK on 5 January 2008, Rupp said that he had transmitted to his HVA controllers the message that NATO was not preparing to launch a surprise nuclear attack against the USSR during the exercise. He did this by way of encoding the message on a device disguised as a calculator which then turned the message into a short electronic burst which could be transmitted to a set telephone number. He viewed this as vital to preventing a Soviet pre-emptive strike against NATO forces. In the same program, Rupp said he was proud of the damage he did to NATO over the years of his intelligence activities.
