= Wolfgang Schwanitz =

German intelligence official (1930–2022)

Lieutenant General Wolfgang Schwanitz
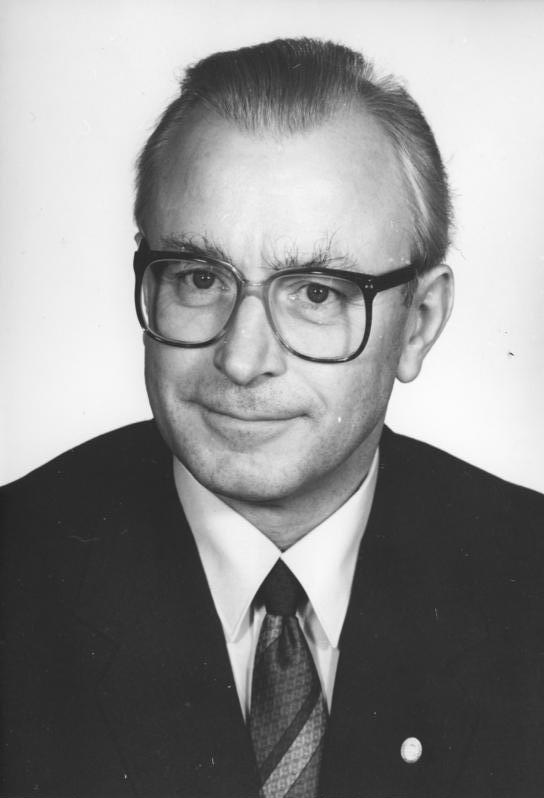
- Schwanitz in 1989

Head of the Office for National Security
- In office 18 November 1989 – 11 January 1990; Leave of absence: 14 December 1989 – 11 January 1990
- President: Egon Krenz; Manfred Gerlach
- Prime Minister: Hans Modrow
- General Secretary: Erich Honecker; Egon Krenz
- Preceded by: Erich Mielke (as Minister for State Security)
- Succeeded by: Position abolished

Deputy Minister for State Security
- In office November 1986 – 18 November 1989
- President: Erich Honecker
- Prime Minister: Willi Stoph; Hans Modrow
- General Secretary: Erich Honecker

Head of the Stasi in Berlin
- In office February 1974 – November 1986
- President: Willi Stoph; Erich Honecker
- Prime Minister: Horst Sindermann; Willi Stoph
- General Secretary: Erich Honecker
- Preceded by: Erich Wichert
- Succeeded by: Siegfried Hähnel

Personal details
- Born: 26 June 1930 Berlin, Free State of Prussia, Weimar Republic (now Germany)
- Died: 1 February 2022 (aged 91) Berlin, Germany
- Party: Independent
- Other political affiliations: Socialist Unity Party (1953–1989)
- Education: Humboldt University of Berlin; Juristische Hochschule des MfS (Dr. jur.)
- Occupation: Politician; Civil Servant; Wholesale Merchant
- Awards: Patriotic Order of Merit, 3rd class

Military service
- Allegiance: German Democratic Republic
- Branch/service: Stasi
- Years of service: 1951–1990
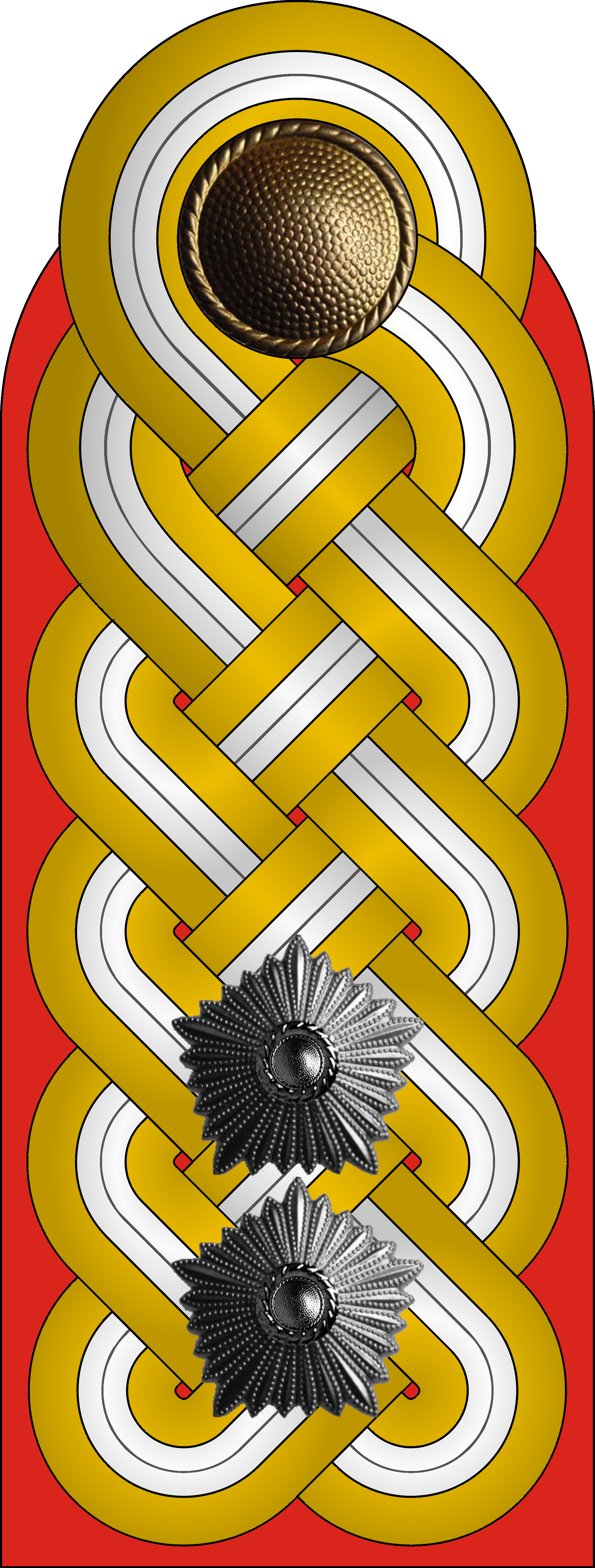
- Rank: Lieutenant General
- Central institution membership: 1986–1989: Candidate member, Central Committee

Wolfgang Schwanitz (26 June 1930 – 1 February 2022) was a German intelligence official, who was the last head of the Stasi, the East German secret police. It was officially renamed the "Office for National Security" on 17 November 1989. Unlike his predecessor, Erich Mielke, he did not hold the title "Minister of State Security", but held the title of "Leader of the Office for National Security". Following the German reunification, he was active as an author of works that sought to portray the Stasi in a positive light.

== Career in East Germany ==
=== Early developments ===
Schwanitz was born in Berlin. He became a member of the Free German Youth when the German Democratic Republic was founded. In 1950, he became a member of the Society for German–Soviet Friendship (German: Gesellschaft für Deutsch-Sowjetische Freundschaft), and in 1953, of the Socialist Unity Party of Germany, the ruling East German communist party. He worked for the Stasi from 1951, and studied at the college of the Stasi, where he earned a doctorate with a dissertation on "combating hostile tendencies among the youth" (German: Bekämpfung feindlicher Erscheinungen unter Jugendlichen) (the doctorate is not recognized in present-day Germany). Between 1974 and 1986, he was head of Stasi in East Berlin. In 1986, he was appointed Stasi Lieutenant General and deputy of the Minister for State Security by Erich Mielke.

=== Appointment as the "Leader of the Office of National Security" ===
During the collapse of the communist regime in the autumn of 1989, both the long-time Head of State of East Germany, Erich Honecker, and the long-time head of the Stasi, Erich Mielke, resigned from their positions. Schwanitz was appointed the successor of Mielke as Leader of the Office for National Security and member of the Council of Ministers. The Stasi was dissolved on 31 March 1990. Since German reunification, Schwanitz was a leading member of the historical revisionist organisation Gesellschaft zur Rechtlichen und Humanitären Unterstützung, consisting of Stasi veterans who defend the communist regime and the Stasi.

== Personal life and death ==
Schwanitz died on 1 February 2022, at the age of 91.

Government offices
Preceded by Erich Mielke as Minister for State Security	Head of the Office for National Security; 18 November 1989–11 January 1990	Succeeded by Office abolished

== Literature ==
- "Schwanitz, Wolfgang". Wer war wer in der DDR? (in German). Bundesstiftung zur Aufarbeitung der SED-Diktatur.
- Hubertus Knabe, Die Täter sind unter uns. Über das Schönreden der SED-Diktatur, Propyläen, Berlin 2007, ISBN 978-3-549-07302-5
