= Erich Bär =

Erich Bär (born 23 May 1916 in Dresden; died 5 April 2005) was a resister against Nazism and later lieutenant colonel of Ministry of State Security (Stasi) of the GDR. He was, from 1957 to 1972, head of the executive offices of the Stasi in East Berlin.

== Life ==
Bär, son of a worker, after compulsory education trained as a tinsmith and plumber. Early on, he was active in communist organizations and was from 1931 to 1935 a functionary in the Young Communist League of Germany.

After the Nazi seizure of power, Bär supported the KPD also in the underground and was charged in 1935 with "conspiracy to commit high treason". Without trial he was detained until 1945 in the penitentiaries Zwickau, Berlin-Plötzensee and Bremen-Oslebshausen and from 1938 to 1945 in the concentration camp Buchenwald.

== After 1945 ==
After the end of the Second World War Bär became a member of the KPD. In 1946 he became a member of the SED. In 1947 Bär was deputy staff chief of the Saxony police. In 1949 he worked for the main administration for the protection of the national economy of Saxony; from there emerged in February 1950, the Saxony state administration of the Stasi. In 1952 he became deputy head of the district administration Bezirk Neubrandenburg of the Stasi; from 1953 at the rank of lieutenant colonel. In 1956 Bär became deputy head of the district administration Frankfurt an der Oder. In 1959 Bär rose to deputy head of the Department VII, in charge of the Ministry of the Interior and Volkspolizei.

In 1960 Bär became officer on special assignment at the Volkspolizei within the Ministry of the Interior. In 1962 Bär was employed in the Stasi Department passport control and investigation office and in 1963 he was Officer of Special Affairs in the line II office, responsible for the support of the West German DKP and the Socialist Unity Party of West Berlin.

Bär retired in 1972.

== Honours ==
- 1986 Patriotic Order of Merit in Gold

== Literature ==
- Gieseke, Jens: Erich Bär. In: Wer war wer in der DDR? 5. Ausgabe. Band 1, Ch. Links, Berlin 2010, ISBN 978-3-86153-561-4.
- Gieseke, Jens: Wer war wer im Ministerium für Staatssicherheit (MfS-Handbuch). BStU. Berlin 2012.
- Wilke, Manfred, ed. (1998), Anatomie der Parteizentrale : Studien des Forschungsverbundes SED-Staat an der Freien Universität Berlin (in German), Berlin: Akademieverlag, ISBN 3-05-003220-0
