= Bengt Hägglund =

Swedish theologian (1920–2015)

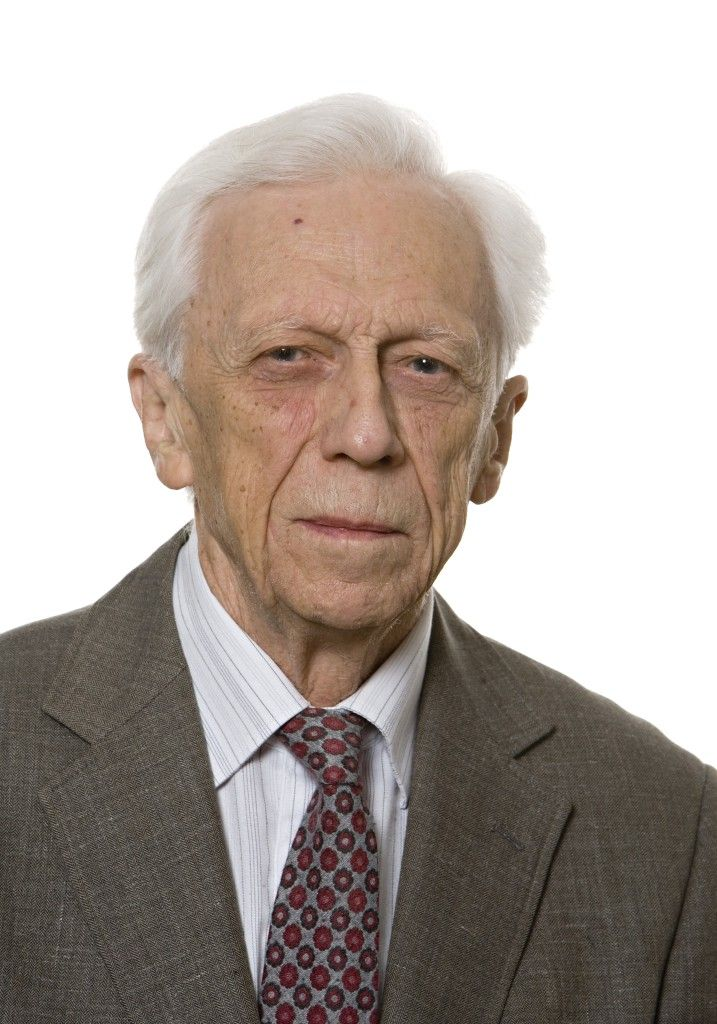
Bengt Hägglund

Bengt Vilhelm Hägglund (22 November 1920 – 8 March 2015) was a Swedish theologian. Hägglund, who was professor emeritus of Christian intellectual history at Lund University, has written several books, of which Teologins historia (English: History of Theology) is his most widely known work. The book, translated, inter alia, to English, German, Portuguese and Russian, was first published in 1956.

== Biography ==
Upon graduation from secondary school in 1938, Hägglund enrolled at Lund University, writing his dissertation in 1951. From 1951 until 1958 he was associate dogmatics professor. In the 1958–59 term he was acting professor of dogmatics. In 1958 he was a guest lecturer at Germany's Heidelberg University before returning to Lund as a forskardocent (research fellow, 1960–69). In 1966-67 he was again a guest lecturer, this time in Mainz, Leipzig, Rostock and Greifswald.In 1980 he was a short time guest lecturer in Fort Wayne, Indiana. He was professor of Christian history (1969–1987) at Lund.

In 1971 Saint Louis University, a private Jesuit institution, awarded Hägglund an honorary doctorate of divinity, and in 1981 he received an honorary doctorate of theology from Ruhr University Bochum. From 1975 to 1995 he was vice-president of the north German Luther-Akademie in Ratzeburg. On 10 November 2007 the Oberursel Lutheran theological seminary (Lutherische Theologische Hochschule) bestowed on Hägglund its Hermann Sasse Prize for theological literature.

== Selected works ==
- 1951: Die Heilige Schrift und Ihre Deutung in der Theologie Johann Gerhard: eine Untersuchung über das altlutherische Schriftverständnis ("Holy scripture and its interpretation in the theology of Johann Gerhard: a study of Conservative Lutheran understanding of scripture", Thesis)
- 1955: Theologie und Philosophie bei Luther und in der occamistischen Tradition. Luther's Stellung zur Theorie von der Wahrheit doppelten ("Theology and philosophy in Luther and the Ockhamist tradition. Luther's position on the doctrine of double truth")
- 1956: Teologins historia: En dogmhistorisk översikt ("History of theology: a historical overview of dogmatics", ISBN 91-7271-028-4, translated into English by Gene J. Lund as History of theology, ISBN 0-570-03293-8
- 1959: De homine: Människouppfattningen i äldre luthersk tradition ("Of man: Conception of human nature in the Conservative Lutheran tradition), ISBN 978-91-7580-383-8
- 1969: Semantik och traditionsforskning: ett kompendium i metodfrågor ("Semantics and the research of tradition: a compendium of methodological issues").
- 1971: The background of Luther's Doctrine of Justification in Late Medieval Theology, ISBN 0-8006-3063-7
- 1982: Trons mönster: en handledning i dogmatik ("Patterns of faith: a tutorial in dogmatics"), ISBN 91-7271-029-2
- 2000: Traktat om liturgin i den svenska kyrkan ("Treatise on the liturgy of the Church of Sweden"), ISBN 91-7238-156-6
- 2002: Arvet från reformationen: teologihistoriska studier ("Legacy of the Reformation: studies in theological history, ISBN 91-7271-008-X
- 2003: Sanningens regel = Regula veritatis: trosregeln och den kristna traditionens struktur ("The rule of truth = Regula veritatis: the rule of belief and the structure of the Christian tradition") ISBN 91-7580-251-1
- 2003: Chemnitz-Gerhard-Arndt-Rudbeckius. Aufsätze zum Studium der Theologie altlutherischen ("Chemnitz, Gerhard, Arndt and Rudbeckius. Essays on the study of Conservative Lutheran theology"). Texts and studies on Protestantism of the 16th to 18th centuries, Volume 1, ISBN 3-933688-93-0
- 2007: Tro och verklighet ("Belief and reality"), ISBN 91-7580-339-9
- 2011: Kunskapsteori och metafysik i teologin ("Epistemology and metaphysics in theology"), ISBN 978-91-633-8258-1

== Sources ==
- 1985: Tro och tradition: festskrift till Bengt Hägglund på hans 65-årsdag ("Belief and tradition: In honour of Bengt Hagglund on his 65th birthday"), ISBN 91-85846-62-7
