= Rosenholz files =

East German foreign intelligence files

The Rosenholz files are a collection of 381 CD-ROMs containing 280,000 files with information on persons who were sources and targets or employees and helpers in the focus of the Hauptverwaltung Aufklärung (HVA, “Main Directorate for Reconnaissance”), the primary foreign intelligence agency of the former German Democratic Republic (East Germany). At the beginning it was thought that the files mostly contain the real names of agents who worked for the HVA in the former West Germany, but later it became clear that at least 90% of the persons never worked for or with the HVA.

The Rosenholz files ended up in the hands of the United States Central Intelligence Agency (CIA) during the German reunification under unclear circumstances; they were initially analysed by the United States only, but finally returned to Germany in 2003 after long negotiations. The exact reason for the duration of the negotiations is still debated among scholars.

According to the annals of the former Moscow CIA station chief Milton Bearden, the Rosenholz files were not seized on January 15, 1990, when demonstrators stormed the Ministry of State Security in East Berlin, but instead only when President George H. W. Bush personally contacted the chief of the Berlin CIA station. Bearden later lobbied for the return of the Rosenholz files to the Federal Commissioner for the Stasi Records (German: Der Bundesbeauftragte für die Stasi-Unterlagen, BStU) while CIA station chief in Bonn, and received the German government's Bundesverdienstkreuz (Federal Cross of Merit).

After being returned, the files were checked for mistranslation and other errors by the Stasi Records Agency; since June 2003, the files have in theory been open to the general public and can be viewed following an appropriate request (Antrag auf persönliche Akteneinsicht). However, because of the unclear compilation of the files, many requests were turned down.
