= Kuczynski =

Kuczyński, Kuczynski, Kuchinsky, Kuchinski or Kuchinskiy is a Slavic surname.

Language	Masculine	Feminine
Polish	Kuczyński	Kuczyńska
Romanian	Cucinschi	
Belarusian (Romanization)	Кучынскі (Kuchynski, Kučynski)	Кучынская (Kuchynskaya, Kučynskaja)
Latvian	Kučinskis	
Lithuanian	Kučinskas	Kučinskienė (married); Kučinskaitė (unmarried)
Russian (Romanization)	Кучинский (Kuchinskiy, Kuchinsky)	Кучинская (Kuchinskaya, Kuchinskaia)
Ukrainian (Romanization)	Кучинський (Kuchynskyi, Kuchynskyy)	Кучинська (Kuchynska)

== People ==
=== Kuczynski, Kuczynska ===
- the Kuczynski family of intellectuals and spies which included Brigitte Kuczynski Lewis alias Bridget Lewis, her brother Jurgen Kuczynski (1904–1997), Marguerite Kuczynski (1904–1998), Renate Simpson Kuczynski (1923–2014), Robert René Kuczynski (1876–1947), his daughter Sabine Loeffler Kuczynski (1919–2005), and Ursula Kuczynski (1907–2000) alias "Sonya", also a sister of Jurgen Kuczynski's.
- Alex Kuczynski (born 1967), American journalist
- Bert Kuczynski (1920–1997), American baseball and football player
- Fridrich Kuczynski (1914–1948/9) a member of the Organization Schmelt, sentenced to death for being responsible of 100,000 Holocaust Jewish victims.
- Chris Korwin-Kuczynski (born 1953), Canadian politician
- Iwona Kuczyńska (born 1961), Polish tennis player
- Jan Kuczyński (1935–2009), Polish wrestler
- John Kuczynski (born 1973), American darts player
- Julius Kuczynski (1914–2000) AKA Pee Wee King, American musician
- Jürgen Kuczynski (1904–1997), German economist, spouse of Marguerite
- Kamil Kuczyński (born 1985), Polish cyclist
- Marguerite Kuczynski (1904–1998), German economist, social scientist, spouse of Jürgen
- Maxime Hans Kuczynski (1890–1967), German-Peruvian physician
- Pavel Kuczynski (1846–1897), Polish composer
- Pedro Pablo Kuczynski (born 1938), Peruvian politician and economist, 59th President of Peru
- Robert René Kuczynski (1876–1947), German economist and demographer
- Stefan Maria Kuczyński, Polish historian
- Ursula Kuczynski (1907–2000), German author and spy for the Soviet Union

=== Kuchinsky, Kuchinskaya, and other forms ===
- Elena Kuchinskaya (born 1984), Russian racing cyclist
- Mikhail Kuchinsky (1911–1995), Soviet Air Force officer
- Natalia Kuchinskaya (born 1949), Russian artistic gymnast
- Valeriy P. Kuchinsky (born 1944), Ukrainian diplomat and politician

== See also ==
- Kuczyńskie
- Kucinski
- Kulczyński
- Kaczyński
