= Kaczyński =

Kaczynski or Kaczyński (Polish pronunciation: [kaˈt͡ʂɨj̃skʲi]; feminine: Kaczyńska, plural: Kaczyńscy) is a Polish-language surname. Its Lithuanian equivalent is Kačinskas.

Language	Masculine	Feminine
Polish	Kaczyński	Kaczyńska
Lithuanian	Kačinskas	Kačinskienė (married); Kačinskaitė (unmarried)
Russian (Romanization)	Качинский (Kachinskiy, Kachinsky)	Качинская (Kachinskaya)

== People ==
- Aleksandra Kaczyńska (born 1954), Polish rower
- Andrew Kaczynski (born 1989), American journalist and political reporter for CNN
- Bogusław Kaczyński (born 1942–2016), Polish classical music journalist
- David Kaczynski (born 1949), American activist, Theodore Kaczynski's brother
- Elliot Kaczynski (born 2010), Swedish racing driver
- Filip Kaczyński (born 1987), Polish politician
- Jarosław Kaczyński (born 1949), Polish politician, former prime minister of Poland
- Lech Kaczyński (1949–2010), Polish politician, former president of Poland, Jarosław Kaczyński's twin brother
- Maria Kaczyńska (1942–2010), Polish economist, Lech Kaczyński's wife
- Richard Kaczynski (born 1963), American writer
- Ryszard Kaczyński (born 1954), Polish politician
- Sophie Kaczynski, character from 2 Broke Girls, played by Jennifer Coolidge
- Stanislaus Katczinsky, All Quiet on the Western Front character
- Ted Kaczynski (1942–2023), American mathematician, social critic, and serial terrorist mail-bomber known as the Unabomber
- Thomas Kaczynski Jr. (born 1955), American politician

== See also ==
- Kaczynski towers, Espace Léopold, Brussels, Belgium
- Kuczynski
- Kuczyńskie
- Kucinski
- Kulczyński
