= Maik Hamburger =

German translator, writer, and dramaturge (1931–2020)

Maik Hamburger (12 February 1931 – 16 January 2020) was a German translator, writer and dramaturge, regarded as one of the leading Shakespeare scholars of his generation in the German-speaking world.

== Biography ==
=== Early life ===
Michael Pitt "Maik" Hamburger was born on 12 February 1931 in Shanghai, where his parents were living and working at the time. His father, Rudolf Hamburger (1903–1980), was a German architect originally from Lower Silesia. His mother, born Ursula Kuczynski (1907–2000), had accompanied her husband to China. His maternal grandfather was economist and demographer Robert René Kuczynski. Hamburger's family was Jewish.

Both his parents were committed to antifascist communism, and his mother had joined the party in 1926. Both parents at some stage became involved in spying for Soviet intelligence; the Shanghai construction boom may have been the chief reason for their decision to relocate to Shanghai during the first half of 1930. Rudolf Hamburger's espionage career was probably not of huge value to the Soviet Union: Ursula Kuczynski, however, would become well known to English and American espionage watchers some decades later, as the Oxfordshire-based "handler" of nuclear scientist Klaus Fuchs between 1943 and 1950.

The marriage of Hamburger's parents came under increasing pressure, ending in divorce in 1939. By the time he was ten, he had lived successively in China, Czechoslovakia, Poland and Switzerland, before ending up in England in 1940, after his mother had married Len Beurton, also a Soviet agent, and one who came with the added attraction of a British passport for his new wife. While still a toddler, Maik Hamburger was separated from his parents and sent to live with his father's parents (now relocated from Germany to Czechoslovakia) for seven months, while his mother was sent to Moscow for a half-year training session in "espionage spycraft". There had been a concern that if baby Michael had accompanied her to Moscow he might inadvertently have blown her cover later by blurting out words in Russian.

After settling with his mother and Janina, his younger half-sister, in Oxford in 1940 he appears initially to have attended school in the city. From 1944 to 1948, he attended Eastbourne College in East Sussex. Later his mother moved into a village outside the city while her son—possibly in connection with his maternal grandfather's senior lectureship at the London School of Economics—lived "as a cultural omnivore" in London, attending performances at the city's famous theatres and sitting in the top gallery at each of them where, as he later recalled, you "could sit on a hard bench for sixpence and view the action from an overhead perspective". At weekends he often attended Speakers' Corner in Hyde Park, listening to orators setting out their visions for solving the world's problems, and staying late into the night till there were no more than two people left, at which point he underwent, on at least one occasion, the unsettling experience of being approached by an orator whose chief objective seemed to have become an unsuccessful (as he insisted!) attempt to win Hamburger over for a night of homoerotic adventurism. During his time as an adolescent in London, Maik Hamburger was also an exceptionally appreciative member of his local public library.

=== Studies ===
He enrolled later at the University of Aberdeen and embarked on a Philosophy degree course. One of his teachers, as Professor of Moral Philosophy, was Donald M. MacKinnon (1913-1994), known to friends and students alike as "Mac", a "corpulent eccentric" whose teaching was based around Kant and Hegel. The other principal teacher was a glamorous Polish exile called Wladyslaw Bednarowski (1908-2002), whose contributions involved invoking Wittgenstein, Ryle and Ayer to prove that "90% of what Kant and Hegel wrote was senseless twaddle" ("aus sinnlosem Geschwätz besteht").

Hamburger realised he did not wish to spend the rest of his life trying to create new patterns of philosophy by "reconfiguring very old ones", and he became "disillusioned with Britain’s turn right". He briefly considered moving to the recently launched state of Israel and joining a Kibbutz, but was unenthusiastic about the "militant" aspects of life in Israel.

Shortly before the unmasking of Klaus Fuchs, his mother had relocated suddenly from north Oxfordshire to (east) Berlin in 1950, and in August 1951 Maik Hamburger visited the city to attend the "Weltfestspiele der Jugend und Studenten" ("World Festival of Youth and Students"). He was impressed: as he later told an interviewer, he "wanted to be somewhere where things were happening. I wanted to be in the middle of political life. And in Germany, particularly in Berlin, you had all this…".

In or before November 1951 he abandoned his studies at Aberdeen and enrolled at Leipzig University (known, after 1953, as the "Karl-Marx-University Leipzig"). Here he started to study for a degree in physics.

=== Theatre ===
Very soon, however, it became clear that he was more strongly drawn to the world of the theatre. In 1952 he made his stage debut in a student theatre production of Simonov's "Russische Frage" ("The Russian Question"). By 1954, still in Leipzig, he was at the centre of a circle of student actors, artists and instrumentalists. An important member of the group was the student Adolf Dresen, who became a colleague and later a notable and, some said, controversial theatre and opera director.

=== Work as a translator ===
After leaving Leipzig, between 1956 and 1966 Maik Hamburger lived in East Berlin, where he supported himself as a freelance translator and journalist. In 1966 he took a post at the Deutsches Theater (Berlin), where he would remain for almost thirty years, working both as a dramaturge and, later, as a director. During this time he also built a reputation as a talented translator into German of foreign works by dramatists such as William Shakespeare, Sean O'Casey, Arthur Miller and Tennessee Williams.

In 1982 he teamed up with Christa Schuenke to translate and publish a volume of John Donne's poetry under the title "Zwar ist auch Dichtung Sünde" (loosely, "Poetry is indeed also sin").

In 2008 he compiled and published an English-language history of German theatre with Simon Williams, which was published by the Cambridge University Press.

=== Teaching career ===
Maik Hamburger pursued a parallel career in teaching. During the East German years he taught at the Leipzig Theatre Academy (Theaterhochschule) and at the Ernst Busch Academy of Dramatic Arts in Berlin. He also taught at the Berlin University of the Arts and led theatre workshops at Santa Barbara, Stanford and Montreal. He was a member of PEN Centre Germany. After reunification in 1990 he was elected and repeatedly re-elected as vice-president of the German Shakespeare Society, a position from which he resigned in 2002. He was succeeded by Roland Petersohn. In 2007 he received the honour of a stipendium from the Hermann Hesse Foundation of Calw.

=== Death ===
Hamburger died in Berlin on 16 January 2020.
