= Rudolf Hamburger =

German architect and spy

- Born: Rudolf Albert Hamburger; 3 May 1903; Landeshut, Silesia, Germany
- Died: 1 December 1980 (aged 77); Dresden, German Democratic Republic
- Occupations: Architect; GRU intelligence agent
- Political party: SED
- Spouse(s): Ursula Kuczynski (1907–2000) married 1929, divorced 1939
- Children: Maik Hamburger (1931–2020)
- Parent(s): Max Hamburger (1868–1952); Else Gradenwitz (1873–1937)
- Relatives: Brothers: Viktor Hamburger (1900–2001); Otto Hamburger (1907–1997)

Rudolf Albert Hamburger (3 May 1903 – 1 December 1980) was a German Bauhaus-inspired architect. Many of his most important commissions were undertaken in Shanghai where he lived and worked between 1930 and 1936. Late in 1930, his wife Ursula Kuczynski was recruited to work for Soviet intelligence; he supported her espionage related activities in various practical ways until their divorce in 1939, after which he became involved with spying for the Soviets on his own account.

By 1943 he had ended up in Tehran where British forces were present in large numbers. Imprisoned successively by American forces and British forces, when he managed to get away he made for the Soviet Union in order to seek asylum. Three days after arriving in Moscow he was arrested. He spent the next ten years in a succession of labour camps, and after a further two years in "internal exile" was able to leave the Soviet Union in 1955. He moved to Dresden and resumed his architectural career.

Rudolf Hamburger is known to students of espionage as the first husband of Ursula Kuczynski, celebrated in some quarters as "Stalin's best female spy" ("Stalins beste Spionin").

== Life ==
=== Provenance and early years ===
Rudolf Hamburger was born at Landeshut, a small town on the southern edge of Lower Silesia. He was the second of his parents' three recorded children, all of them boys. In 1890 his father, Max Hamburger (1868–1952), had inherited from an uncle one of the several textile mills in the town. The administration offices and storage facilities were adjacent to the family home. During the 1920s the business employed 850 people. Max Hamburger was for many years chairman of the local chamber of commerce and, unusually for his class, a committed activist in liberal politics. Else Gradenwitz, the boy's mother, was a banker's daughter: she looked out for the women working in the factory and provided a kindergarten for their children. The grandparents all lived in Breslau and vacation stays in the city were frequent. In 1908, inspired by the "Krupp settlement" in Essen, the firm had built a model housing estate ("Siedlung") for the workers. Hamburger would describe his upbringing as Liberal Jewish. He was encouraged, as a child, to play with the children of the workers at the factory and, to the extent that he was politically engaged, he shared his father's progressive tendencies. Many years later, after he died, an English friend would describe Rudolf Hamburger as "the last Victorian communist".

=== Student years ===
Rudolf Hamburger was taught to sketch by Friederich Iwan, a local artist, while he was still a boy. He successfully completed his schooling and moved to Munich to study architecture in 1922. The assassination of the Foreign Minister, Walther Rathenau, that year came as a particular blow. Rathenau had been a close personal friend of his father's: the shocking event and the rising tide of right-wing extremism, which was particularly hard to miss in Munich, demonstrated the fragility of the new liberal-democratic political order. Contemporary architects by whom he was particularly influenced during his two years in the Bavarian capital included Theodor Fischer (1863–1938), Gabriel von Seidl and German Bestelmeyer (1874–1942). He moved to Dresden in 1924 where he studied for around a year, and met Richard Paulick, a fellow trainee architect who became a close friend. Their careers would frequently become entwined during the decades that followed.

In 1982 Ruth Werner (as Ursula had by that time become known) wrote to the recently widowed Gemma Paulick, recalling how she had first come to know Rudolf Hamburger and Richard Paulick back in the 1920s:

- "The student Richard Paulick was 22. I was 18, and used to wait outside the studio of the uniquely brilliant architect, Prof.Poelzig, not waiting for Richard but for his friend Rolf [Rudolf Hamburger], who was 'my one'. But I always had to include Richard in the package, because the two of them lived together as sub-tenants of the same land-lady ... Richard's energy and dogged confidence commanded respect."
- "Der Student Richard Paulick ist 22 Jahre alt. Ich bin 18 und warte vor dem Atelier des originellen, temperamentvollen Architekten Professor Poelzig nicht auf Richard, sondern auf seinen Freund Rolf [Rudolf Hamburger], der auch der meinige ist. Richard muss ich in Kauf nehmen, da die beiden gemeinsam zur Untermiete bei einer Wirtin wohnen. (...) Seine Energie und sein verbissener Fleiß imponierten mir".

In 1925 Hamburger and Paulick moved on to the Technische Hochschule in Berlin-Charlottenburg (now Technische Universität Berlin), where they shared lodgings. They were taught by Hans Poelzig, whom the students idolised. Poelzig renounced traditional teaching methods, instead holding classes in his studios at the Arts Academy, and giving his students tasks from his current commissions. Fellow students, as Hamburger later recalled, included alongside the (relatively) conventional German students, a Croiatian, an Austrian aristocrat, a Japanese who designed interiors in meticulously co-ordinated pastel shades, an anarchist and a Hungarian girl with a completely unjustified belief in her own genius. Often the group round his table also included a tall polite young man, a reticent and likeable youth keen, like the others, to master the architect's craft. The students, and almost everyone else, would learn more about Albert Speer after 1933. Rudolf Hamburger emerged with a degree in 1927.

During 1926, while a student in Berlin, Rudolf Hamburger met Ursula Kuczynski, a qualified bookshop assistant. An unusual bookshop assistant, his new friend was also one of the six children of the distinguished demographer René Kuczynski. She had joined the Communist Party in May 1926 when she was just 19. Ursula was deeply committed politically and possessed of a formidable intellect. The two became friends and then lovers. They married in Berlin in 1929.

=== Post-qualification ===
Hamburger stayed in Berlin after graduating, taking a job as a construction manager with the Prussian Building and Finance directorate ("Preußischen Bau- und Finanzdirektion"). The job was not particularly stellar, but offered the possibility of taking more exams in order to become certified as a "master builder". In 1928 he took a job with Marie Frommer. There are suggestions that while with Frommer he probably worked on the "Hotel Villa" project in Berlin-Wilmersdorf. In October 1928 he became a Master Student ("Meisterschüler") at the Arts Academy studios with his former professor, Hans Poelzig. While there, till March 1930 he worked on the administrative building under construction for I.G.Farben at Frankfurt. There was also time for personal projects which earned him very little money, but nevertheless helped win recognition: he set up the "Red Bookshop" near the Görlitz Station for a friend of Ursula's.

=== Political awareness ===
Getting to know Richard Paulick during his year in Dresden had brought Rudolf Hamburger into contact with social democratic ideas. In Berlin his friendship with Ursula introduced him to leftist intellectual circles, and he became familiar with the aspirations of those who believed in a new better society. He found himself drifting away from the conservatism of others in the architectural profession, and drawn towards the optimistic radical pacifist idealism represented by artists such as Käthe Kollwitz. He kept his distance from day-to-day political activism. He joined no political party. But he did join "Red Aid", a workers' welfare organisation with close links to the Communist Party. Another member was Ursula's father, René Kuczynski. Hamburger began to read Marx and Engels. "I was no longer just an observer. I grasped the nature of the class-based social structure and drew from that the obligation to participate in class struggle. But I still found it difficult to take the next step, to political activism. I was still too strongly drawn to my family's middle class life, with the old prejudices and habits .... Above all I was alienated by the hostile attitude that the Communist Party displayed towards the SPD" ("Ich wurde nicht nur Betrachter, sondern erfasste das Wesen der Klassengesellschaft und die Verpflichtung, daraus die Konsequenz des Klassenkampfes zu ziehen. Der Schritt zur Aktivität fiel mir dennoch schwer. Zu stark war ich noch dem bürgerlichen Leben durch Elternhaus, alte Vorurteile und Gewohnheiten verbunden. ... Vor allem befremdete mich die feindliche Haltung der KPD gegen die SPD").

=== Shanghai ===
==== Start of the adventure ====
From a western perspective, in 1930 Shanghai was seen as a dynamic capitalist enclave surrounded by a feudal society. That offered opportunities for foreign entrepreneurs. The authorities were keen to attract investment: labour was abundant and inexpensive. The huge disparities of wealth and poverty also created a febrile political environment. It was in Shanghai that the Chinese Communist Party had been founded in 1921. The economy was hugely dynamic. The political context was defined by massive tensions. The community of expatriates from the west included White Russian émigrés escaping the consequences of the Russian Civil War who would be joined, after 1933, by large numbers of German refugees forced to leave their homeland by Nazi race policies. There were international businessmen driven by conventional commercial and colonialist motives. All the time, there was a Chinese nationalist government under Chiang Kai-shek keen to re-assert control over Shanghai. The creation by the government of the "Greater Shanghai" municipality on 14 July 1927, covering 828,000 hectares, had been a first step in that direction, even though it had been necessary to exclude from it the territory of the foreign concessions. In 1930 Shanghai was the focus of an on-going power struggle between the Chinese authorities and international business, backed by the "great powers", America, Britain, France and, increasingly,had no friends· Japan.

During the first half of 1930, Rudolf Hamburger responded to a job advertisement placed in a local Berlin newspaper by the Shanghai Municipal Council (SMC). His application was successful and in July 1930, armed with a contract to work as an architect with the SMC, he emigrated with his wife to Shanghai. Long distance travel was typically undertaken by sea during this period, but the Hamburgers travelled by train via Moscow and across Siberia to Manchuria, where they switched to a ship for the final part of the journey. One source indicates that this slightly unconventional route was chosen in order to save money, since the SMC had refused to pay their travel expenses. Shortly before they left Berlin Ursula's parents organised a dinner party to which they invited Hellmut Wilhelm, the son of a celebrated (but recently deceased) "China expert". Wilhelm was able to brief them on some of the basics of living and working in China. It is nevertheless more than possible that the contemporary social and political realities of the situation in Shanghai, the extent to which the city had become a cultural melting pot, and indeed the way in which it had become a magnet for international espionage, only became apparent to the couple once they arrived in their new home-city.

==== Architect ====
Shanghai was riding a construction boom in which Rudolf Hamburger was able to participate fully. He found his SMC employment better paid than his private work, and he found that his monthly salary was 50 Taels higher than that of other architects employed by the Public Works Department. This was explained as compensation for the fact that he had been obliged to pay his own travel costs for the passage to China. However, when in April 1933 he opted to extend his contract, the differential was maintained although the differing treatment of those inter-continental travel costs had by that time been more than expunged. The renewed contract took effect in August 1933 after which Hamburger was the second-best architect employed by the council. Only C.H.Stableford, his department head, was paid more. This, according to his wife, may have reflected the international reputation of modernist German architecture at the time. (Most of his colleagues in the architecture department were from England.) Hamburger's own approach was strongly influenced by his old teacher, Hans Poelzig.

In Shanghai, Rudolf Hamburger produced four large buildings and several smaller ones. There were also a very large number of interior designs and examples of furniture design. The interiors were in part produced by the firm he set up and ran in parallel with his work for the council, "The Modern Home". In addition to the buildings for which he is known to have been directly responsible, scholars detect Hamburger's influence in other contemporary developments, such as the Chengdu Road police station.

His first major building, which he was permitted to work "quite independently", was a nine-storey apartment block to accommodated 70 nurses. It has been described as "probably the first modern building in Shanghai". It was built by the SMC for the "Country Hospital", itself housed in a simple "classical" building opened in 1926 and designed by the young Hungarian László Hudec. The block occupied a dominating site directly beside the main road, which it shielded from the less visually challenging hospital building itself. Imaginative design features compensated for the essentially rectangular shape of the building. The high water table and the relatively soft soil meant that the block had to be constructed on 680 wooden piles, each approximately 20 meters long. Reinforced concrete beams were used to distribute the weight of the building's frame structure. The apartments were finished to a high standard, with radiators and insect nets for the windows. The "Victoria Nurses' Home" (today Huadong Hospital’s Building No. 5) opened on 23 October 1933 and was widely praised both by senior medical personnel and in the press.

Hamburger's second major Shanghai commission was his secondary girls' school in the Singapore Road, designed for approximately 500 pupils (today Shanghai No. 1 High School). The building was again close to a main road, and the layout in relation to the adjacent road junction meant that a simple rectangular floor plan could not be specified. The two ends of the block featured rounded "semi-tower" shapes, and alongside the main three-storey classroom block there was a long low "pavilion" for the housemaster's accommodation. The courtyard incorporated a waiting area for the "rickshaw coolies" taking the young ladies to and from school. As with all his designs, the school was planned with huge attention to detail and great thought for function. It was a showpiece for modern ideas concerning light, air, sun and ventilation. Hamburger's third major commission, the vast cruciform Ward Road Jail complex (today Tilanqiao Prison), was an entirely different proposition, meeting an entirely different set of requirements and challenges, but Hamburger's imagination and attention to detail, along with his exploitation of modern knowledge and materials, were again on display.

==== Expat society ====
By 1930 the number of German nationals in Shanghai had reached perhaps 950. (There were thought to be approximately 4,000 Germans in the whole country.) Rudolf and Ursula became part of the German expatriate community, with links to the consulate and the more important mercantile families. With a construction boom underway, there was also an international network of architects and city planners into which Rudolf Hamburger was quickly integrated. For any German architect it was not unhelpful that Shen Yi, the young director of the city's Public Works Department and the man who had prepared the City Plan Framework ("stadtplanerische Konzeption") for Greater Shanghai, had received his doctorate at Dresden. A third social grouping, possibly more loosely interconnected than the first two, to which the Hamburgers were drawn was that of the leftwing political activists, Comintern members and other foreigners involved with the intelligence services of the various foreign governments interested in the city.

The couple fitted well enough into the expatriate communities, though they received regular confirmation that their leftwing political beliefs were out of line with the mainstream both for the German-speaking business community and with the international architects. One aspect of local custom that troubled then was the extent of gift-giving, whether involving simple cash payments or vast food hampers at Christmas time. Letters home suggest they had trouble deciding what counted as friendliness and what counted as corruption, though Rudolf's architect colleagues were happy to confirm that it was simply a pleasing aspect of normal custom. One expatriate with whom the Hamburgers would have been able to discuss politics without inhibition was the Missouri-born journalist-author Agnes Smedley. The Hamburgers first met Smedley on 7 November 1930, which, as they would all have known very well, was the anniversary of the October Revolution. (Note: The October Revolution took place before the Russian empire had adopted the Gregorian calendar. It broke out on 25 October 1917 according to the old-style calendar, which equated to 7 November 1917 according to the Soviet calendar adopted by Soviet Russia in February 1918.) Smedley had lived in Berlin during the 1920s, mastering German and working as a campaigning journalist committed to equal rights for women and liberation for India. She had travelled to China from Berlin by train, via Moscow, setting off in December 1928 and ending up in Shanghai in May 1929. Here she joined up with a circle of German communists with whom she worked, though she herself never became a party member. Till the end of 1931 she worked as a correspondent for the Frankfurter Allgemeine Zeitung. In the early part of 1932, the worsening political climate in Germany and complaints lodged with the German consul in Shanghai by Chinese nationalists led the Frankfurter Allgemeine to dispense with her services. Agnes Smedley became involved with Richard Sorge during 1930. Sorge was a co-ordinator for Soviet Intelligence who had arrived in Shanghai at the start of 1930. Sorge left Shanghai at the end of 1932 and it is thought that he and Smedley never saw one another again.

Ursula Hamburger and Agnes Smedley started seeing each other every day soon after meeting in November 1930, and Ursula started helping Smedley with her work. They also went to the cinema together and toured the local canals in a house-boat. It was in Smedley's apartment that the Hamburgers met the spy-sociologist Chen Hansheng who regaled them with information about the student movements in Beijing and Nanjing. The Hamburgers and the Chens became frequent visitors to one another's homes. Chen had already met Urusla's father, probably when studying for his doctorate (1927) in Berlin. In 1931 Ursula took a share in a language school that Chen's wife, Gu Shuxing opened in Shanghai. Rudolf Hamburger served as an architectural consultant on the project. However, Gu Shuxing refused to pay the usual bribes and the language school was closed down after a few days. Early in summer of 1935, the Chens were forced to flee the city, making their way in a disguise organised by Agnes Smedley to the ship that would take them to relative safety. Rudolf Hamburger would meet up with Chen Hansheng one last time, half a lifetime later, visiting Beijing as an East German tourist in 1964.

==== Recruitment (Ursula) ====
In November 1930 Agnes Smedley arranged a meeting between Ursula Hamburger and Richard Sorge. Sorge was working for Soviet intelligence in Shanghai while pretending to be living from his work as a journalist. At the time she was also being courted by Comintern which seems to have been operating a rival or complementary operation in Shanghai, also directed from Moscow. In the end, Ursula agreed to work for the group of intelligence activists around Sorge without "breaking her head" over the identity of the precise agency that employed her. Initially, her role was essentially passive, and simply involved making the couple's apartment available for weekly conspiratorial meetings. The cover story used was that the visitors were her Mandarin language teachers. Sometimes weapons or printed material was hidden in the apartment, unbeknown to Rudolf. It was only when a Chinese comrade had to be hidden in the apartment that Rudolf was made privy to what was going on.

Rudolf Hamburger's involvement seems to have evolved more on a step by step basis. A member of the Polish Communist Party, known by his code name as "John", was working in a shop alongside the North-Szechuan Road, undertaking photographic jobs for the group around Sorge. The shop and its dark room became a secret meeting place and a secret meeting point for couriers. Sorge's deputy, Karl Rimm from Latvia, arrived in Shanghai during 1931, using the cover name "Klaas Selmann", and participated in activities at the photography shop. During the final part of 1931 Rudolf Hamburger used his architectural training to plan an extensive refurbishment for the premises. At the end of January 1932, Japanese war ships landed troops in Shanghai. That was followed by an attack of the Chinese quarter of Zhabei, which caused many civilian casualties. Rudolf and Ursula Hamburger worked hard demonstrating solidarity with the Chinese population. It was an extremely active time for the group around Richard Sorge. Ursula became more and more involved in "basic research". A succession of visits to hospitals and district police stations were designed to create a favourable impression of the Communist Party leadership in Moscow among the Chinese population. Rudolf Hamburger engaged actively in this work.

==== Friend in need ====
Alongside his work as an employee of the SMC) city planning office, in 1932 Rudolf Hamburger opened his own company, working on interior design and construction, called "The Modern Home" (TMC). By the start of 1933, the firm was faced with a growing backlog of orders. Already Richard Paulick, Rudolf Hamburger's friend from their student days, had been studying emigration options. In January 1933 the Nazis took power and lost no time in transforming Germany into a one-party dictatorship, built on the twin populist pillars of hope and hatred. On April 1, 1933, the Nazi boycott of Jewish businesses was observed across Germany. Only six days later, the Law for the Restoration of the Professional Civil Service was passed, banning Jews from government jobs. Richard Paulick was Jewish. The Hitler take-over injected Paulick's emigration planning with a sudden urgency. In Dessau, where he lived and worked, he felt acutely threatened by the gangs of Nazi thugs. Rudolf Hamburger's invitation came at the right time. In Shanghai it was still possible to arrive and work without any special visa, simply with a valid passport. Richard Paulick caught the train to Venice and on 8 May 1933 embarked on board the SS Conte Rosso, arriving in Shanghai on 2 June 1933. He started work with "The Modern Home" on 6 June 1933.

==== Maik ====
The Hamburgers' first child, Maik Hamburger was born in Shanghai in February 1931. Till now the Hamburgers had been living in rented accommodation, but they now acquired a house of their own, moving into a large terraced property at Avenue Joffre 1676, in a notably verdant part of the French Concession in April 1931. Hamburger organised a new facade along with characteristically colourful and comprehensive renovation of the interior. Visitors were impressed, which led to a series of further "dwelling house" commissions from members of the "expat community". Maik later became a German Shakespeare scholar. In April 1933 Maik was sent to live with Rudolf Hamburger's parents (now relocating from Germany to Czechoslovakia) when Ursula was sent to Moscow. There had been a concern that if baby Michael had accompanied her to Moscow he might inadvertently have blown her cover later by blurting out words of Russian.

==== Ursula becomes 'Sonja' ====
Richard Sorge was recalled to Moscow in December 1932 and drew the attention of his intelligence chiefs to his talented young recruit, Ursula Hamburger. In May 1933 Ursula was invited to Moscow for a training period lasting at least half a year. She was given the cover name "Sonja", and received appropriate political and technical schooling. After almost a year, in April 1934 she returned to Shanghai accompanied by her new handler, Johann Patra (cover name "Ernst"), and the two of them then continued on to Mukden (today known as Shenyang) where they had been sent by Moscow. Maik, now aged three, was returned from Europe and went to live with his mother in Mukden. Rudolf Hamburger remained in Shanghai. The impact of fascist government policies in Germany and Japanese aggression drove him ever more uncompromisingly towards Communism. In May 1934 he began to undertake small "services" for his wife and Johann Patra in connection with their work for the GRU. However, it is clear that at this point his contribution was provided in terms of support for his wife rather than as an intelligence agent on his own account. Ursula Hamburger was providing a communications link to Moscow for Chinese partisan groups engaged in fighting the Japanese occupation of Manchuria. While she was in Mukden Rudolf Hamburger visited his wife two times, delivering spare parts for a radio transmitter.

In April 1935 Ursula had to leave Mukden in a hurry after one of her Chinese contacts was arrested and she faced the risk of betrayal. Her Moscow handlers sent her to Beijing where she lived in the home of the sinologoist Hellmut Wilhelm who was in Germany on home leave. They were approaching the anniversary of their arrival and Rudolf Hamburger was also due for home leave: travel costs for his entire family would be funded by his employer. He was also faced with having to decide whether to renew his contract with the SMC for a further five years. His existing contract would otherwise expire in April 1936. Taking account of accrued entitlement to leave, if he did not renew he would be able to leave at the end of 1935. Ursula's handlers had suggested that if she were to travel west she might consider doing so via Moscow in order to discuss her work. Rudolf (according to his wife's subsequently published autobiography) had by now become a convinced communist and was keen not to remain "politically inactive" for any longer: Ursula informed her Moscow handlers of this development. A poorly timed additional complication presented itself in August 1935 when Ursula decided she was definitely pregnant, not by Rudolf but by her intelligence contact, Johann Patra. Ursula's departure from China took place suddenly, following the arrest of a colleague in Shanghai. Rudolf agreed to stand by Ursula, at least till the birth of her child, despite the extramarital nature of her pregnancy. She had to break with Johann Patra. Moscow, fully briefed on Ursula's situation, now proposed a posting for the couple in Warsaw. For the GRU handlers, organising the documents necessary for a young middle-class architect and his family to move to Poland, and integrating them appropriately in Warsaw, would be far less of a challenge than arranging for the settlement of a single mother with two small children. In 1936 Rudolf and Ursula Hamburger moved to Warsaw. It would later transpire that in 1937 the Soviets awarded Ursula the Order of the Red Banner for her espionage work in China. Without ever wearing a uniform, she now held the rank of colonel in the Soviet military.

=== Warsaw ===
The return to Europe at the end of 1935 gave Rudolf Hamburger his first opportunity to stop off in Moscow and meet the leaders of the GRU, for which he had already worked in a succession of difficult situations, without having had direct contact with an intelligence handler. Ursula introduced him. Rudolf was in some ways disappointed: "My wish had been to take on independent [intelligence] work in the future, and to receive appropriate training for the purpose. This wish was not fulfilled, but I received promises." ("Mein Wunsch war es gewesen, in Zukunft eine selbständige Arbeit zu übernehmen und zu diesem Zweck vorher eine Ausbildung zu erhalten. Aber dieser Wunsch wurde mir nicht erfüllt, sondern für später versprochen."). The Hamburgers arrived in Warsaw in February 1936. Obtaining visas and permits on the basis of passports issued by the German consulate in Shanghai three years earlier proved a major challenge. Rudolf Hamburger visited the visa office in Warsaw almost on a daily basis for several weeks, and it was necessary to obtain agreement from his friend, the Polish architect Szymon Syrkus to act as a guarantor: after several months of effort, and more than forty visits by Rudolf, the officials finally issued the Hamburgers with twelve-month visas.

Ursula's daughter by Johann Patra, Janina, was born in April 1936, soon after the couple's arrival in Warsaw. Rudolf Hamburger immediately acknowledged the baby as his own. (Note: It was not till 1955, shortly before he returned home after twelve years during which he had been variously detained in the Soviet Union, that Janina's mother informed her daughter that Rudolf Hamburger was not, in fact, her "real" father. With the engaging spontaneity of youth, the nineteen-year-old immediately objected: "Mom, I don't like that you've had so many men!" ("Mutti, dass du so viele Männer hättest, gefällt mir nicht!")) The parents of Rudolf and Ursula were not told about the child's true paternity. Sources nevertheless suggest that by the time they arrived in Warsaw the Hamburgers' marriage had been "shakey" for some time.

The Polish authorities were in a state of high anxiety about the international situation, anticipating trouble from the Soviet Union to the east and from Nazi Germany to the west. Polish partitions had a long history. High levels of domestic unemployment had also given rise to legal restrictions on the employment of foreigners. In order to address these difficulties Rudolf Hamburger traveled to Paris where he signed a contract to work as a foreign correspondent for the specialist journal L'Architecture d'aujourd'hui. He also signed a similar contract with a London based specialist architecture journal. His status as a foreign correspondent may have reduced the obstructiveness the couple encountered among officialdom when applying to extend their residence permits, and enabled them to lead a relatively conventional middle-class existence.

In Warsaw the Hamburgers became friendly with Szymon Syrkus (1893–1964) and his wife Helena (1900–1982) who were both involved with the International Congresses of Modern Architecture. With the help of Syrkus, Rudolf Hamburger entered into a form of architectural partnership with a Warsaw architect called Spiwall. The partnership concentrated on residential houses and villas. Hamburger's residence permit did not permit him to earn money in Poland. Some sort of financial arrangement with Spiwall was nevertheless devised, and Hamburger did most of his partnership work from home. However, a succession of "conspiratively arranged" changes of address made it increasingly hard for Hamburger to work in the city. He did draw up plans for a substantial ten dwellings unit for his partner, and also found professional work in Kraków. Towards the end of 1937 the Hamburgers moved to Zakopane, a winter resort in the mountains near the Czechoslovak border, to the south of Kraków. Rudolf traveled to Warsaw only a couple of times each month. Otherwise, he spent the winter working at home on plans that could only be implemented with the Spring thaw.

In 1937 the Hamburgers received a personal visit from Ursula's handler in Moscow, who was keen to evaluate the local situation for himself. During the summer of 1937, Ursula undertook a three-month training visit to Moscow. Stalin's purges against enemies of the regime were at their height. More than a thousand German political refugees from Nazism were among the many Muscovites identified as Trotskyites and spies: in many cases, they were summarily tried and shot. Ursula Hamburger was well aware of what was going on, but she herself never fell victim to Stalin's paranoia.

Rudolf Hamburger subsequently wrote that his contribution to Soviet intelligence during the time in Poland was in effect restricted to the help he was able to give his wife. He involved himself in the installation of radio antennae and getting hold of components for radio receivers/transmitters, along with general repairs and maintenance. There was code compilation, reception and transmission, stand-by duty through the night "and more". On several occasions he insisted on transmitting his own messages to Moscow, asking when he would be able to come to Moscow for intelligence training in order to be able to undertake intelligence work on his own account. Disappointingly, replies received from Moscow were invariably dismissive, deferring, as it felt to Hamburger indefinitely, any closer working relationship between Rudolf Hamburger and Soviet intelligence.

In June 1938 Moscow the Hamburgers' time in Warsaw came to an end. Ursula was called to Moscow for a three-month training: a new posting for her had already been decided upon. The children were sent to stay with Ursula's parents who since 1933 had been living in London, England as refugees from Nazi Germany. Rudolf spent the summer across the Atlantic, visiting his elder brother, Viktor who had been settled as a professor of Embryology at Washington University in St. Louis since 1935.

=== Vaud and recruitment (Rudolf) ===
Ursula's next posting was to Switzerland. In September 1938 Rudolf and Ursula Hamburger moved to a small house in Caux (Vaud), a three-hour walk up into the mountains above Montreux. Shortly after their arrival in Switzerland the Hamburgers' German passports lapsed. Since they were both Jewish there was little prospect of easily renewing the documents, which left them effectively stateless. In order to avoid difficulties with the Swiss authorities, they surrendered their German citizenship. Through a middle-man who had connections with the League of Nations, at the other end of Lake Geneva, they acquired Honduras citizenship in return for an appropriate payment. In order for them to reside legally in Switzerland it was, also necessary for Rudolf Hamburger to transfer money regularly from Shanghai, via London, to Switzerland. He also continued to contribute material to the specialist architecture journals in Paris and London. It was, however, in Switzerland that Rudolf Hamburger finally concluded that the lifestyle his wife's espionage work was imposing on them was no longer tolerable.

Finally, in the first part of 1939 Moscow agreed that Rudolf might undertake intelligence work with direct links to the service. On his own initiative, he spent two months in Paris attending a course on radio technology, although French was not one of his principal languages and there are indications that language difficulties reduced the usefulness of the course to him. When he got back to Switzerland the message came through that Moscow's first assignment for him involved a posting to China. Moscow had also communicated an instruction that before he left for China he and Ursula should formally divorce, which they did. The Hamburgers' divorce opened the way for Ursula to marry Len Beurton in February 1940. Aside from any romantic considerations, this may also have been part of a longer-term Soviet plan. Len Beurton was a Soviet agent. More importantly, he was born in Essex, England, and by marrying him Ursula was able to exchange her recently purchased Honduras passport for a British passport.

In 1939 Rudolf Hamburger was determined not to be downhearted when it transpired that his GRU contact man in China was to be the man who had been his former wife's lover and the biological father of his wife's second child:

- "My wife's former co-worker [Johann Patra] was to go with me to China, train me, and carry out certain assignments with me ... There were no personal conflicts between us on account of his earlier cohabitation with my wife ... As men, we understood each other. The past was the past."
- "Der frühere Mitarbeiter meiner Frau, Kurt [Johann Patra], sollte mit mir nach China gehen, mich ausbilden und mit mir bestimmte Vorhaben ausführen. ... Persönlich gab es zwischen uns wegen seines früheren Zusammenlebens mit meiner Frau keine Konflikte. ... Als Männer verstanden wir uns, die Vergangenheit war erledigt."
Rudolf Hamburger quoted by Eduard Kögel

A further indignity came with the news from Moscow that his GRU handler for his assignment was to be Johann Patra, Ursula's former handler and the biological father of Janina, the baby who was to grow up believing that her father was the man to whom her mother had been married when she was conceived and born, Rudolf Hamburger. Having finally been added to the GRU payroll, however, Rudolf Hamburger was determined to make light of the matter.

=== Return to China ===
On 20 April 1939 at Marseille Rudolf Hamburger boarded the ship that would take him to Asia. His earlier China trips had used the overland route, and this was the first time he had made the journey by sea. Many of his fellow passengers were German-Jewish refugees, as he reported in a letter dated 25 April 1939 to his elder brother, Viktor. They were heading for "one of the few places left in the world still open to them, Shanghai, where they would join some 7,000 unemployed German co-religionists already there. They spoke not one word of English and were really in a pitiful state" ("An Bord befinden sich Mengen von Glaubensgenossen, die alle nach dem für sie einzigen noch offenen Platz in der Welt fahren, Shanghai – um zu den 7.000, die schon dort sitzen ohne Arbeit noch einige mehr hinzuzufügen. Sie sprechen kein Wort englisch und sind überhaupt recht armselige Gewächse"). Viktor Hamburger had been based in Missouri since 1935 but the third brother, Otto Hamburger (1907–1997), was now living in Shanghai. After the brothers' mother had died in 1937 their father had relocated to Shanghai and joined his youngest son. This meant that although Rudolf Hamburger still had no details on the intelligence assignments that he would be given in China, he did already know that he was on his way to a family reunion. The family, at this point, knew nothing of Rudolf's divorce, though they did know that the children were staying behind with Ursula in Switzerland.

This time, however, the intended ultimate destination for Rudolf Hamburger was not Shanghai, where he planned to spend at most fourteen days before moving on further to the north. A Sino-English firm of building contractors which he knew well from the old days had offered him architectural work. Details had been a little hazy, but the offer had nevertheless appeared acceptable. From his letters it turns out that he did not sail directly from Marseille to Shanghai, but disembarked at Singapore in order to obtain a visa for "Siam, Indochina and Java". He toured around, taking in Kuala Lumpur, Bangkok, Phnom Penh and Saigon, and then in July 1939 took a passage on a coastal boat from Saigon to Shantou (Guangdong) from where he made his way on to Shanghai. He was still in Shanghai in November 1939, having stayed there "longer than intended, as a result of the war". He was finding some architectural work, but only for very modest residential accommodation. There was no return to the grand projects. There is a certain studied vagueness in the letter he sent his brother Viktor in November 1939, and it seems reasonable to infer that Soviet intelligence still had not found him anything important to do. During this time in Shanghai, he was living not with his brother but on his own in a small house. Most of the friends and colleagues he had known when he lived in Shanghai during the early 1930s were gone: those that remained were not the ones whose company he was inclined to seek out. Under the guidance of Johann Patra he stayed in his little house and occupied himself with the operation of radio transmitters and receivers, and on a rather "superficial" ("oberflächlich") level, explosives procedure. (Patra himself lived elsewhere, in relative safety, with a rich Chinese family.)

=== An assignment at last ===
It seems to have been early in 1940 that Patra and Hamburger received instructions to find comrades in Shanghai who might be persuaded to work as "enlighteners", converting local people to Communism. However, the Chinese communists had left Shanghai in 1937 when, following months of bitter fighting, the city (apart from the International Settlement and the French Concession) had been placed under Japanese military occupation. Patra and Hamburger, therefore, decided to look for candidates in other cities. Through the wide circle of friends and acquaintances he had acquired during years in Shanghai, Hamburger had contacts with a doctor in with a German wife, living in Xi'an. He set out to find the doctor so as to be able to win him for the communist cause with a face-to-face talk. There were, at least on the map, at least two ways to get from Shanghai to Xi'an. There was a more or less direct cross-country route that involved a combination of buses and trains, but both Patra and Hamburger believed that this was unacceptably dangerous because of the war. The alternative route, approximately three times as long, involved travelling by ship to Hong Kong, from where it would be possible to take a flight to Chongqing, Chiang Kai-shek's wartime capital between 1937 and 1946. Hamburger intended then to follow a land route from Chongqing Xi'an.

Although he had a large amount of luggage to take, Patra still insisted that Hamburger should travel with a radio transmitter-receiver so that they might stay in touch. The device was concealed inside a commercially available portable radio. In March 1940 Rudolf Hamburger traveled with his luggage to Hong Kong. Here he had problems with the English border officials because he was travelling on a Honduras passport., but after an involuntary stay of several hours he was able to catch a flight for Chongqing where the Chinese authorities found and confiscated his radio for inspection. He was able to collect it from them two days later. It was handed over without comment, leaving Hamburger none the wiser as to whether they had failed to spot the true nature of the device hidden in the radio, or they knew very well that it was an espionage-grade receiving-transmitting device and were now alerted that his further moves would need to be closely monitored.

The involuntary stay in Chongqing was not without incident. He unexpectedly came across a German acquaintance and a rich Chinese woman whom he had known in Shanghai. Bizarrely, he also came across Agnes Smedley who, it seemed, was working on a book about the war. Hamburger found time to send a letter to his father in Shanghai. He wrote, "The air-raids are not so harmless as you thought. They were called off in the 'misty season', but now they are again expected and feared. Thousands are being spent on constructing air-raid shelters and using explosives to create shelters under the cliffs" ("Die air raids sind doch nicht so harmlos wie du glaubst. Sie waren in der misty season unterbrochen, aber sie werden jetzt wieder erwartet und gefürchtet. Tausende wurden ausgegeben, um Unterstände zu bauen und in den Felsen zu sprengen").

Hamburger now caught a flight from Chongqing to Chengdu. The final 500 or so miles to Xi'an he covered by bus. He left the radio device and other technical equipment with his acquaintances in Chongqing. In Xi'an he met his communist friend and a group of the friend's comrades. He convinced several to go to Manchuria in support of his political mission. They were first to come to Shanghai to "sign up" and then travel on to the north. Hamburger was also intending to make his new base in Manchuria. His work in Xi'an completed, he returned to Chongqing to collect his radio receiver-transmitter. He was keen to make contact with Patra back in Shanghai in order to be able to report on what he had achieved. The radio needed repairs, but he was able to purchase the necessary parts in a specialist parts. "Shortly after that I was arrested".

The "blue-eyed naivete" Rudolf Hamburger repeatedly demonstrated during his first and last serious intelligence mission provide implicit support for the assessment of his strengths and weaknesses which the Soviet intelligence directorate had presumably carried out ten years earlier.

=== Arrest in the Chungking Hostel ===
The enforced transfer of the Chinese capital from Nanjing to Chongqing after 1937 led to a major influx of foreign journalists to the new capital. These and any other foreign visitors were encouraged to make their base in the so-called Chungking Hostel. Rudolf Hamburger was one who did just that. Japanese air raids took place only between April and September: winter mist made them impossible during winter months. In the summer there were raids most nights, and hotel guests hurried to shelter in a cave in the grounds which had been adapted as an air-raid shelter. During one of those summer nights, probably in April 1940, Rudolf Hamburger and two other suspects were arrested. The American journalist Emily Hahn was one of those who witnessed the arrest. She was sufficiently impressed to recall it in an autobiography: "He chewed up a paper and tried to swallow it. It had a code on it, exactly like the movies". His room was immediately searched. The radio transmitter-receiver and the accompanying kit of spare parts were found and confiscated. The two individuals arrested with him were both people with whom he had been seen conversing a few times: they were soon released.

In Shanghai, Otto Hamburger received a message in "Ganoven-jargon", a semi-secret dialect/language: "H's Bruder als Späher in Kittchen. Soll weggeputzt werden". Otto inferred that his brother Rudolf and been arrested and was in danger of being disappeared. He communicated the news to Rudolf's "communist friends" and the information was presumably passed through to Moscow. Members of the Hamburger family later believed that by passing on the message Otto had probably secured Rudolf's eventual release. Meanwhile, Otto also used his own contacts to try and secure Rudolf's release, invoking the help of a senior nationalist Chinese government official who was in Shanghai at the time whom the Hamburger brothers both knew well. The senior official sent off a telegramme to a colleague in Chongqing, vouching for Rudolf's good character. A few days later it was the helpful official who lost his job. The case of Rudolf Hamburger was evidently one that the government took seriously.

=== Detention ===
Hamburger was held in a wooden building that was attached to a police station in Chongqing for approximately three weeks. He was interrogated about who he was, who had sent him and what he was doing. No Chinese reports of his interrogations have been accessed, but recalling these events many years later he indicated strongly that he had given nothing away. After eight days the interrogation sessions resumed, now involving serious physical torture, but still Hamburger did not betray his comrades.

Early in the morning, after approximately three weeks in the "wooden shack" at the police station, Hamburger was driven away in a large limousine to a formerly private estate in the countryside outside the city. The twelve room mansion had been commandeered during the war for use as an interrogation prison and was "home" to forty or fifty detainees. Apart from Hamburger, the inmates were all Chinese. Female detainees were kept across the yard in a separate building that had previously accommodated the household servants. From the front of the house, there was a fantastic view stretching thirty or forty kilometers across valleys and rivers. He was permitted to enjoy the view for fifteen minutes each day, through the two bars that had been placed across the window of the front room on the ground floor where he was taken for his "daily walk". Hamburger later described his incarceration in this manor house as relatively benign, though he also reported that all the detainees, including him, fell ill with Malaria. At six weekly intervals he was taken before an investigating magistrate, and each time he refused to testify he was returned to custody.

Hamburger's Chinese imprisonment lasted for nine months, during much of which he shared his "cell" with a Chinese student identified as "Wong Pin Fong". His cell-mate had (he said) ended up in detention as the ringleader of an illegal street protest. The pressure on Hamburger under these circumstances was to keep his thoughts to himself, and to avoid reacting to his companion's constant questions about his own situation. Wong Pin Fong communicated his own unremarkable conclusions: "Foreigner ... in reality you can really only be a member of the American or Soviet secret service" ("... eigentlich kannst du nur zum amerikanischen oder sowjetischen Geheimdienst gehören"). With no prospect of freedom in sight, and every indication that he and his fellow detainees might remain where they were for many years until malaria and the increasingly sparse diet finished them off, Hamburger became ever more depressed.

=== Soviet intervention ===
General Chuikov arrived in the Chinese provisional capital in November 1940 as the youthful new Soviet military attache. The Russian empire had suffered military humiliation at the hand of the Japanese military in 1905, and with the 1937 invasion of China by Japan the Soviet leadership were quick to strengthen political ties and physical communications links with the nationalist Chinese. The outbreak of war in Europe increased Moscow's determination to minimise the dangers of Japanese aggression against the motherland from the east. A major complication was the attitude of the Chinese Communist Party (CCP) under the leadership of Mao Zedong. Instead of joining the government to present a common front against the Empire of Japan, the CCP saw the Japanese invasion as an opportunity to pursue their own goals in opposition to the government with renewed vigour. Relations between the government and the CCP became so dreadful that in January 1941 Chiang Kai-shek, the leader of the Chinese government, found himself forced to invite Moscow to intervene as a mediator between the government and the CCP.

A the end of January 1941 Hamburger was taken for another of his six weekly encounters with the investigating magistrate. This time there were no questions. Instead, his interlocutors informed him that now they knew where he came from, and that he would shortly be released and sent back. In the words of his own later report of the matter, "the friends had intervened" ("Es war eine Intervention seitens der Freunde."). (Note: Between 1955 and his death in 1985 Rudolf Hamburger lived in the Soviet-sponsored German Democratic Republic, where the term "the friends" was widely used, with a certain cautious irony, as an alternative designation for the Soviet Union.)

=== Return to Moscow ===
In 1939 a regular direct flight connection had been established between Chongqing and Moscow. It was now possible to fly from one capital to the other in only five days. At the start of February 1941 Rudolf Hamburger took the flight to Moscow. He was now accommodated with others in a Dacha settlement a short distance outside Moscow. There are indications that the settlement was at Kuntsevo, where it is known that there was a training centre for potential intelligence operatives. During the early summer of 1941 he received extensive training, although according to his later reports the nature of it was uneven and the organisation of it often chaotic. Sometimes lecturers "came out from Moscow" But some of the most important lessons came from discussions with fellow students who, like Hamburger, had already had the benefit of a certain amount of experience in the field. By June 1941, with the German invasion imminent from the west, he was packing his bags again.

=== A new assignment ===
His destination, this time, was Turkey, from where he was to provide intelligence reports on developments in the Middle East. In order to address the potential limitations of travelling on his Honduras passport, he intended to travel by train to Vladivostok and from there, by sea, to Shanghai. From there he would be able to travel legally through India and Iran to Turkey without having to apply for a visa. This journey did not work out quite as planned, however, since on 22 June 1941, in breach of the non-aggression deal between Nazi Germany and the Soviet Union, German troops stormed across the frontier. After rapidly knocking out the Soviet Union, the German plan was to continue through to Iran and capture the oil fields. The Great Patriotic War became suddenly urgent and there were no more ships sailing from Vladivostok to Shanghai. Hamburger was summoned back to Moscow. His handlers did not cancel his assignment, however. Since the original itinerary was impossible because of the absence of a sea passage from the est of the country to Shanghai, and alternative plan was devised whereby the various visa stamps would be added in his Honduras passport by Soviet intelligence, providing a forged trail indicating that he had traveled via Shanghai and India to Tehran. Then, during the Autumn of 1941, he drove across by the land route via Tbilisi in Georgia and through Armenia to Tabriz near the border in northern Iran. That meant that regardless of his passport stamps, he had to this point made the entire overland journey through territory controlled by the Soviet Union. By October 1941 he had reached Tehran.

Hamburger was keen to continue to Turkey as instructed, but with international tensions rising in the area the Turkish authorities reacted negatively to his Honduras passport, and he encountered difficulty obtaining a visa. Meanwhile, the situation in Iran had changed dramatically since the early summer, and the country had gained in strategic importance with regard tho the war. In August 1941, the British and the Soviet invaded and occupied Iran by a massive air, land, and naval assault. There was a concern that the shah was insufficiently anti-German and in September 1941 he had been persuaded to abdicate in favour of his son. The German invasion of the Soviet Union three months earlier had made the United States into an unlikely backer of Stalin's Soviet Union, and the Americans now raced to create a robust transport infrastructure which by 1942 had become the route by which approximately a third of all the overseas supplies to the Soviet Union were delivered. In 1943 1.6 million tons of equipment and food were delivered to the Soviet Union through Iran. The hub of the road and rail route from the sea ports to the Soviet border was Tehran. At some stage, presumably while he was still trying to arrange a visa for Turkey, Hamburger's Moscow handlers concluded that he would be more usefully deployed sending reports from Tehran, and he received instructions to stay there.

=== Not Turkey but Iran ===
- "I received the instruction to give up trying to get a visa for Turkey and to concentrate on tasks in Iran. After the political-military occupation of the country by the allied powers, supplies for the Soviet Union were to be organised through the USA and England. The operation took place overland from the Persian Gulf by rail, truck convoys and air transport. A large number of military personnel (USA and England) streamed into the country to co-ordinate the construction of a new transport infrastructure – roadlinks and railway lines – with the Iranian authorities. My task was to monitor all these plans and movements, to establish the numbers of troops and the nature of the military forces which were being concentrated, especially, in the south of the country where the oil fields are, under the guise of 'transport deployments'."
- "Ich bekam die Anweisung, die Versuche eines Visums in die Türkei aufzugeben und mich auf Aufgaben im Iran zu konzentrieren. Nach der politisch-militärischen Besitzergreifung des Landes durch die Alliierten sollte die Versorgung der SU durch die USA und England organisiert und abgesichert werden. Sie erfolgte vom Persischen Golf durchs Land per Eisenbahn, Lastzügen und Luftverkehr. Es strömte eine große Zahl militärischer Stäbe (USA und England) ins Land, welche Transportfragen, den Bau neuer Straßen und Eisenbahnlinien u. a. mit den iranischen Behörden koordinierten. Meine Aufgabe war die Beobachtung all dieser Pläne und Bewegungen, Feststellung der Anzahl von Truppeneinheiten und welcher Gattungen, die vor allem im Süden, im Erdölzentrum, unter dem Deckmantel des Transportwesens hereingeschleust und dort konzentriert wurden.".
  Rudolf Hamburger quoted by Eduard Kögel

For Stalin the large US military presence that appeared in Iran towards the end of 1941 was undesirable but necessary, but it was not something that could be viewed with total equanimity. Monitoring of developments on the ground by means of a network of unobtrusive informants, employing agents from third countries, became an important link in the information gathering chain. The US military were naturally aware that various agencies were present on the ground, attempting to fathom their "true" motives. Rudolf Hamburger sought out contacts among the British and American officers and soon developed friendships with them, in pursuit of his information-gathering mission on behalf of his handlers. He used to pass on his findings in face-to-face GRU middlemen stationed at the Soviet embassy in Tehran. This modality was clearly not without its risks, and during 1942 Moscow provided him with a radio receiver-transmitter, instructing him to use it to create a direct reporting link.

In order to provide a legal basis for his presence in the city, in January 1942 he took a job as an architect, working for the Finance Ministry in Tehran. His first project was do design and build a new building for the ministry. Draft pans had been prepared by February. His project team already included six local draftsmen. Another European was hired to supervise the project, though Hamburger himself was also closely involved in co-ordination with the various parts of the ministry, His boss was a doctor-engineer who had trained in Germany who "came from one of the leading families in the land". The language used in the office was French. There was also an Austrian architect involved with whom he was able to discuss some of the more technical challenges of the project. Meanwhile, letters to his brother and father, now both in Missouri, indicate that his health was improving. The altitude of Tehran and the dry air led to a reduction in the frequency of his malarial attacks. His family letters avoided political issues in order to avoid upsetting any censors through whose hands they might pass. (During the war it was impossible to exchange letters with his younger brother in Shanghai.)

In May 1942 the ministry cut the budget for new buildings in Tehran due to the pressures of war. This held up work on the new ministry building on which Hamburger was working. Also, steel production was being diverted to war production which meant that there was not enough steel for all the reinforced concrete that the plans called for. Along with the ministry work, he also found private clients, though he became frustrated by the local builders who liked to substitute their own spontaneous ideas for the plans provided to them. There is a complaint in one of his letters that in Iran architects do not enjoy a very high status.

=== Trapped ===
Early in 1943 an Iranian friend who worked as a simultaneous translator for one of the heads of the American transport and logistics operation invited Hamburger to start working as an "informal collaborator" (informant). Money was offered. The decisive conversation took place in the friend's apartment. Around two weeks later Hamburger found himself arrested by American military police. At his first interrogation session he realised that his conversation in his friend's apartment had been recorded, and that the recording had come into the possession of his interrogators. Hamburger calculated that there was little on that tape that might have incriminated him, and his interrogators evidently agreed. In order to find some more damning evidence the Americans then broke into the little house where Hamburger was living on his own. They gave no evidence of having found whatever it was they were looking for. They did not find the heavy radio receiver-transmitter he had been given by his Soviet handlers, which was kept in an aluminium container the size of a small suitcase, and which was hung casually with a lot of knitting up a disused chimney.

Around the same time Hamburger came across an English military officer in Tehran for whom he had worked in Shanghai ten years earlier. The man had then been working for the British Colonial Police in the Shanghai International Settlement and had been involved in the construction of a new jail which Hamburger had been building. It seemed reasonable to assume that the man was fully aware of the circumstances surrounding Hamburger's arrest two years before in Chongqing. From that it followed that Hamburger's unmasking in Tehran as a Soviet agent could only be a matter of time. The fact that a tape recording of an unsuccessful attempt to recruit him as an informant for another agency indicated that he must already be under observation by the Americans and their British allies. Rudolf Hamburger was now detained and taken to a small military camp just outside the city. Meanwhile his Honduras passport taken away for further scrutiny. The authorities established that stamps placed in it by passport officers in three British colonial - Bombay, Singapore and Suez - could not be matched to any corresponding records in the files of the checkpoints involved. Very quickly the authorities determined that the passport stamps could only have been entered by the Soviet Union's Main Intelligence Directorate. No further trial was considered necessary. By now it was August 1943. His British captors gave him a couple of days to leave the country and, helpfully, delivered him to the Soviet embassy.

=== Asylum ===
Although it might be thought that his contribution to Soviet intelligence had been less than stellar since 1930, and the GRU had given little reason to believe that they valued his services very highly, Rudolf Hamburger had demonstrated a remarkable degree of persistence, commitment and loyalty over the years. Forced to leave Tehran at short notice he welcomed the opportunity to return to Moscow in order to be able to apply for political asylum.

During his time in investigatory detention Rudolf Hamburger became depressed and began to question some of his past decisions and the nature of the Soviet-style communism for which he had worked.

- "Failing in the ambitious ideal of struggling for a better life is cruelly destructive of your ideals. My thoughts drift back to the days when I resolved to move away from my chosen profession, forget about building, and to devote myself to the cause which at that moment was more important, demanding people ready to take up the fight against anti-humanity destructive power. Then I would 'build houses' for a new society. ... they brand as a potential opponents, as traitors, who belong in jail. That is more difficult to bear than the prison cell, the hunger, the condition of being totally without rights."
- "Gescheitert das hohe Ziel, für ein besseres Leben zu kämpfen, grausam zerstört die Ideale. Zurück schweifen die Gedanken zu den Tagen, als der Entschluss reifte, Abschied zu nehmen von meinem geliebten Beruf, das Bauen zu vergessen und mich der Sache ganz zu verschreiben, die im Augenblick grösser war, die Menschen forderte, bereit, den Kampf aufzunehmen gegen eine menschenfeindliche zerstörende Macht. Für eine neue Gesellschaft würde ich dann Häuser bauen. (...) sie stempeln mich zu ihrem potentiellen Gegner, zum Verräter, der ins Zuchthaus gehört. Das ist schwerer zu ertragen als die Gefängniszelle, der Hunger, der Zustand vollkommener Rechtlosigkeit.".
  Rudolf Hamburger quoted by Eduard Kögel

However, two days after his arrival in the Soviet capital had was accused of having worked for US intelligence against the interests of the Soviet Union and taken into investigatory detention. Over the next few weeks he faced a series of interrogation sessions, which took place at night and each lasted several hours. At dawn he would be returned to his cell. He tried to demonstrate his innocence, but the investigators came back with more accusations that he had worked for "other" intelligence services. Many years later the East German homeland security service (MfS) came to hold an information report from the Soviets which included the conclusion "The circumstances of Hamburger's release from detention in Iran gave rise to the suspicion that he had been recruited by a foreign intelligence service" ("Die Umstände der Entlassung Hamburgers aus der Haft in Iran erwecken Verdacht seiner Anwerbung durch einen ausländischen Geheimdienst"). His request for a lawyer was turned down without explanation. From Hamburger's point of view there was absolutely no evidence against him and nothing to justify his detention.

=== Sentencing ===
For slightly more than nine months, between August 1943 and April/May 1944, Rudolf Hamburger was held in investigatory detention in Moscow. He lost twenty kilos (45 pounds): he was badly affected physically and mentally. "For 24 hours you are kept awake, through hunger and stress. To be able to think of nothing and sleep. The food is dire ... hunger is a terrible torture" ("Vor Hunger und Aufregung möchte man 24 Stunden schlafen. Schlafen und an nichts denken. Das Essen ist elend. (...) Hunger ist eine furchtbare Folter"). There was no trial, but he was sentenced to five years in a prison camp. The conviction was based on Article 58 of the Penal Code. A fellow inmate explained that this was the paragraph for "political criminals". However, Hamburger also became aware that his conviction carried an additional three letter tag that identified his as a "socially dangerous element".

=== Saratov labour camp (1944–1945) ===
After receiving his sentence Hamburger was placed on a train and transported to Saratov, a port on the Volga River upstream of Stalingrad (as it was known between 1925 and 1961), and 850 km to the south of Moscow. The labour camp, accommodating German prisoners of war, was on the edge of town. Later he reflected that entering the camp had sealed his status as a citizen sentenced according to laws, without the investigation necessary to prove guilt or innocence, sentenced in breach of basic human rights and without the right to any legal defence. Only "after Stalin's death did the secret of this thousandfold injustice become known. Since the 1930s the People's Commisariat for Internal Affairs has designated special three person committees, the so-called Special boards (OSO) with special powers. These OSOs condemned politically dangerous citizens without any court verdict ... The OSOs were abolished in 1953 after Stalin's death" ("Nach Stalins Tod wurde das Geheimnis dieses tausendfach verübten Unrechts bekannt. Seit den dreissiger Jahren hat das damalige Volkskommissariat für Innere Angelegenheiten Drei-Mann-Ausschüsse, sogenannte OSO, mit Sondervollmachten eingesetzt. Diese OSO verurteilten politisch gefährliche Bürger ohne Gerichtsurteil. (...) Die OSO wurden 1953 nach Stalins Tod abgeschafft").

Although it was his first labour camp, Hamburger had been told by prisoners with whom he had been held in Moscow what to expect. His description reflects his architect's eye. "Here is how the camp looks: a barren bare barrack town. Barracks in rows, rank and file, and barracks at right angles, in a vast landscape on bare ground under an open sky. And that was how life ran, in straight lines and at right angles ... Must I describe a sleeping barrack? ... where a person is reduced to an anonymous little part of a larger whole that vegetates like a cow in a stall? At right angles to the long side walls, in pairs, sets of double-deck bunk beds ... arranged in a way that takes no account of the positions of the windows, due to the shortage of space, and therefore these are partially obstructed and only let in half of the light. In the long wide space down the middle of the hut is a long table constructed of unfinished timber, with long wooden benches the same length ... The table is used by the inmates for meals ... Behind the table is a big tiled stove". One thing he did not know was the Brigade Leader Nikolai was a "Stukatsch", introduced to notice and report on trifling misdemeanours. In the very early spring of 1945 Hamburger was removed from the prison camp and taken to a prison where he faced his first legal hearing ("a farce"), since his sentencing and he was charged with further misconduct. He was placed in a solitary cell ("for hard cases"). The prison governor informed him that a new ordinance had been promulgated to the effect that "Article 58 prisoners" should be kept apart from other prisoners. The cell was unheated and very cold. He began to distract himself with "architectural fantasies." "If I stood up, then I could use the wooden spoon they gave me to scratch the ground plans of houses in the ice crystals forming on the walls, for houses in a dreamland for lucky people with a living room, somewhere for the books, a kitchen, bathroom and garden". The further misdsemeanours which had triggered his transfer from the camp to the prison in the first place had placed him not merely in breach of "Article 58" of the penal code, but also in breach of "Patagraph 10" of "Article 58". His aggravating conduct had involved an American illustrated magazine which he had been given at the camp by the secretary of a US officer. The American military were present in one part of the Saratov labour camp supervising the assembly of a chemicals factory which had been brought in as part of a "wartime relief" programme. Fellow camp inmates were produced to back-up the evidence of the "Stukatsch" brigade leader that Hamburger had been distributing anti-Soviet propaganda. Together with the routine badmouthing of the poor treatment, terrible food and the generally bad situation in the camp, Hamburger was therefore identified as an "enemy of the state". His sentence extended to eight years. Taking account of the two years already served, that made a total of ten years.

=== Karaganda labour camp (1945–1949) ===
In May 1945 Hamburger was taken to the Karaganda region, far to the east in Kazakhstan. He gained the impression that Karaganda was the main camp at the heart of a large network of labour camps covering an area of approximately 33,800 square kilometers. Some thirty kilometers from Karaganda, within the fence surrounding the camp where he was himself held there were the remains of a village called Dolinka (Долинка) that had originally been founded by Volga Germans. The network of camps around Karanda had been created to support the operation of approximately fifty coal mines in the area. Rudolf Hamburger lived one of the former farmhouses in the old village. "We stepped through the front door. Involuntarily I lowered my head. A small whitewashed entrance lobby with a flagstone floor, and behind that a large parlour of about 17 square meters, where six narrow iron bedsteads stood against the walls. In the middle a wooden table with two benches, in the corner a tiled stove ... from the entrance lobby there was also an opening to a small room with two beds in it. .... Life in the farm house is decidedly more pleasant than in the barrack accommodation of a purpose-built labour camp". Unlike the camp where he had been held at Saratov, this time all the prisoners were designated as "Article 58 (political) prisoners".

Hamburger's transfer to this camp was not a random event. It was the result of a targeted search by the camp commander for a construction specialist. He was set to work in a design office with other prisoners. "The building" containing the design office was constructed of dried mud bricks, the floor was of cement screed. Doors and windows were of rustic construction. You had to bend to enter the room over a high step. Beyond were two similarly sized rooms, containing a team of around eight engineers, estimators and draftsmen working at drawing boards and desks. In the room to the left were the building specialists, while the estimators had their workplaces in the room to the right. The work was restricted, as usual, to relatively simple projects such as small annexes and renovation projects for police stations, washing cabins or sleeping barracks for prison camps in the area. One project that moved away from the daily pattern was for an entrance house to a semi-wild area of parkland, suggesting that someone somewhere still had ambitions beyond basic survival. Hamburger put his heart and soul into the project, ending up with a design for a gatehouse of which he was very proud. It was a kind of gatehouse to be fashioned from wood. It drew admiration from colleagues, but was too expensive to be constructed.

=== Return to the Volga region (1949–1950) ===
After four years in the Kazakh Steppes, in May 1949 Hamburger was sent back to the Volga region for a "review trial". However, when he returned to the area near his "first camp", along the Volga basin, he was informed that he had been sent back simply for the correction of a procedural error. The accusation on the basis of which he was being held was not changed. However, prisoners were never returned to camps from which they had been removed, and he was sent to a prison camp a short distance to the north of Saratov. (Note: The camp at Saratov had in any case been emptied of its inmates during the second half of 1947.) He was now set to work as one of approximately ten inmates in a drawing office belonging to a furniture factory. He was involved in making furniture. Some of his colleagues were design experts: others were graphic artists. The programme included office furniture and, on Hamburger's table, a bed-sit combination. The work was more stimulating than his work at Karaganda had been because he was able to see the projects through to the construction phase. Most of the camp inmates - men and women - were employed in the furniture factory itself, and Hamburger was an almost daily visitor to the factory, where he was able to check on the preparation of the timber pieces and recommend changes and improvements.

=== Camp Kama (1950) ===
After a year, around May 1950 Hamburger was moved again. His destination was not initially disclosed to him. He was taken north, to the Ural foothills and placed in a lumber camp near Solikamsk and the Kama River, where he was given responsibility for buildings maintenance. "I was too weak for forestry work. No work brigade would take me. A kindly fellow inmate, also employed in the buildings maintenance office, allocated me the work of drawing up plans and calculations. In a tiny room of one of the barrack blocks, lit by a window the size of a show box, I sat on my own feeling imprisoned twice over". In the limber camp he became overcome by depression and frustration that he still had many more years of imprisonment to look forward to: "It all appalls me. The insignificant tasks I am set, which I have to perform, rough tables with the two scratched either side, the ceilings, the walls gawking at me in dumb stupidity, the whole as a window with its glimpse of the yard, barracks and barbed wire to prevent me from forgetting where I am, and the hunger ... the hunger and the bugs. What do I have to look forward to, if I do survive through to freedom, starved, bitten by beasts, grey-haired, a creature alienated from life and work?"

=== Kuybyshev (1950) ===
However, at this point, his persistent assertions that his sentence was unjust appeared to meet with a small measure of success. At some point during the middle part of 1950 he was sent to a special camp, built on the site of a vast national infrastructure construction site for power stations, dams, canals and reservoirs. Prisoners here were required to prove their value, but in return, their time at this "special camp" was said to count for twice the actual period in terms of expunging outstanding years of sentence. In Rudolf Hamburger's case, that meant that his remaining three-year sentence would apparently be reduced to one and a half years when he arrived at Kuybyshev (since 1991 again identified officially by its pre-1935 name as Samara). He was sent to a labour camp near an abandoned city. "No smoke came out of the chimneys, no human noise, no barking dogs. The city had been evacuated some months earlier. Soon the valley, which had nurtured a vibrant city, would be inundated in a giant flood so as to provide hydro-electric power for new industries and thousands of new homes. A bold and awesome project. So there we were, lined up like a small army of construction workers, technicians and engineers, all prisoners who if we keep up the momentum of the project, will soon be able to welcome our freedom".

In 1950 the Soviet government decided to build what would become at the time, the largest hydro-electric plant in the world. The entire facility came on stream in 1957. It was here that Rudolf Hamburger worked on the conversion of an existing building on the edge of the city to create the offices of an important General. He prepared the plans for the furniture, the lighting and the overall interior design. However, his time at the special camp had lasted only six months when a diligent official noticed that foreigners were not permitted at this site. Nevertheless, due to the regulations governing the "special camp", by this time he had expunged twelve months of his outstanding sentence in just six months.

=== Usollag (1951–1952) ===
There followed a "return to the dreaded Urals" as Hamburger was sent to the "Usollag" Gulag lumber camp. Through a combination of his physical stature and the weakened condition of his body after years in the labour camp system, he was unable to cope with the physical demands of forestry work. He was transferred to the Power Plant Brigade. Here he met up with around twenty German prisoners who had all found themselves classified as "Article 58 prisoners" and sentenced to ten years in the camps. Together they were required to use handsaws to chop up the wood and fuel the wood-burning power generators. One of his fellow prisoners was the writer Heinrich Alexander Stoll who became a long-standing friend. Stoll had been sentenced (without trial) to a ten year term in Siberia in 1950 following a complicated series of events involving espionage allegations and political activism in the Soviet sponsored German Democratic Republic. Hamburger was able to supplement his basic labour camp wage by painting little water colour drawings as picture postcards for fellow inmates. This was a source of supplementary income that he had also, on occasion, been able to use at previous camps.

=== The labour camp system ===
Between 1929 and 1953 the Soviet labour camps consisted of 476 complexes, distributed across the entire western part of the Soviet Union. Lavrentiy Beria became responsible for the camp network in 1939. He launched a major drive to organise the camps according to a national set of precepts and structures, consciously prioritising economic aspects of the system. For Stalin the labour camps were a central pillar of the Soviet economy. When Beria took over, camp commanders received the order to "keep more inmates alive and exploit them more efficiently".

Nevertheless, it is abundantly clear from Rudolf Hamburger's experiences and from other sources that there were always enormous differences from camp to camp. In the words of Tatiana Okunevskaya, a Moscow-born actress who was also a long-term camp prisoner, "each camp was its own world, its own city in its own territory, and each camp had its own character During his final years Stalin became ever more driven by paranoid delusions of counter-revolutionary threats, and he reacted appropriately against different ethnic groupings, rumoured rivals from within the party and "intellectuals". So it is not surprising to find the dictator stating in 1952 that "every Jew is a nationalist and an agent of the American security services. After Stalin died in March 1953, Beria made his own bid for national leadership. That same month he made a proposal that 90% of the more than two million labour camp inmates, who could not be convicted of any serious crime, should be set free. As a national economic resource the network of labour camps was hopelessly inefficient. In economic terms his radical proposal was set in motion, but within the party leadership Beria was seen to pose a threat. In June 1953 Nikita Khrushchev, with powerful backing from sections of the army, had Beria arrested. He was executed on 23 December 1953. The programme of labour camp releases that he had set in motion continued, however.

=== Signs of life from the camps ===
Rudolf Hamburger had been arrested less than two years before the end of the war. After war ended his brother Viktor, living in Missouri, and his ex-wife, who till 1949 lived in an Oxfordshire village, began to receive occasional reports about him via fellow internees who had emerged from the Soviet labour camps. Rudolf Hamburger was not permitted to send or receive letters. In July 1947 Viktor received a letter from a Polish woman who reported that Rudolf was alive and "working as an engineer". His ex-wife, Ursula, wrote to Viktor in August 1947 that she had also received a letter from Poland: "He is a prisoner for five years, but works in his profession. (...) I do not know when the five years will be over. She has been in the same camp with him from July 1945 to December 1946". At this time Hamburger himself was being held at Karaganda in Kazakhstan, and the letters from Poland evidently predated his second sentencing in May 1949.

In October 1953 the US embassy in Bonn received a letter from a man called Josef Dauns who was former inmate of the Soviet labour camps. He was trying to contact Rudolf's brother, Viktor, in Missouri. He reported on his meeting with Rudolf Hamburger at Camp Kama in 1950. The letter was translated into English, presumably by embassy staff, and the translation passed to the State Department in Washington, D.C. In November 1953 a deputy director at the State Department wrote to Viktor Hamburger in St. Louis. The letter asked, in passing, if Rudolf Hamburger was a US citizen and if this could be evidenced. If he was and it could, the State Department would approach the Soviet government with an appeal to release Rudolf Hamburger. In February 1954 Josef Dauns sent another letter, this time directly to Viktor Hamburger, in which he spelled out in greater detail the circumstances of his meeting with Rudolf Hamburger. They had met early in 1951 at Camp Kama in the North Urals. Dauns wrote that Hamburger had been sentenced to 25 years of hard labour for espionage. It is unclear where the notion of a 25 year sentence - for which there is no other known source - came from.

=== Semi-freedom in Soviet internal exile (1952–1955) ===
It was probably towards the end of 1952 or early in 1953, after nine and a half years in Soviet custody, that Rudolf Hamburger was released. "Release" was relative, however. He was permitted to name the place, within the Soviet Union, to which he wished to be released. He had been given no advanced notice of this development and had to think very fast. Simply leaving the country was not an available option. The Soviet Union's great cities were also off limits. "Every other detainee knew, without a map, where he wanted to go. Home. I expressed the same wish, but it was made clear that this would involve a 'number of formalities'". He was stateless, he was not a prisoner of war and he was not even a former party member. Any attempt to organise permission to leave the country would take time, and in the meantime, he "had to live somewhere."

After returning to East Germany, in 1957 Rudolf Hamburger was one of a number of architects invited to contribute to a small volume published to celebrate the "40th Anniversary Celebration of the Great October Revolution". There was, naturally, no mention of labour camps in his contribution, which concluded on a resolutely positive note:

- "The Soviet people have courageously taken control of their own lives. This year they can look back on forty years of success. May they be granted peace for their further progress!"
- "Die Sowjetmenschen nehmen ihr Leben mutig in ihre Hände. Dieses Jahr können sie auf 40 Jahre Erfolg zurückblicken. Möge ihnen Frieden beschieden sein für den weiteren Aufbau!".
  Rudolf Hamburger, 1957, quoted by Eduard Kögel

On his release Hamburger moved to a small Ukrainian city where he lodged with a farmer's wife identified as "Galja". It can be inferred that the city was Millerovo, which today is part of Russia, and an important railway junction along the route between Rostov-on-Don and Moscow, close to the frontier dividing Russia from Ukraine. He was employed there in the Buildings Department of the Ministry of Food. Later in 1953 he was moved to Kamensk, 80 km (50 miles) to the south along the main railway line towards Rostov, where he was installed as a construction site manager for the Ministry of Coal. Later, in April 1955, the ministry appointed him to a position as an architect. In 1957, by which time he had returned to the German Democratic Republic, he published a memoir of his time at Kamensk in a volume published to celebrate the "40th Anniversary Celebration of the Great October Revolution". His contribution appeared with others from East German architects who had visited the Soviet Union only as tourists. Naturally there was no question of Hamburger's piece expressly mentioning his labour camp experience, but his contribution was set apart from the others by some interesting insights and nuances. He did refer to his experiences of the vast industrial buildings erected in the Donets basin and implicitly referred back to some of the things he had seen as a prisoner. He wrote about the dreadful work conditions when ambient temperatures fell below -30 °C, and expressed fulsome respect for the women's brigades used in the earthworks.

=== Contacts in the German Democratic Republic ===
The map had changed in 1945. What had been the eastern third of the country, including Silesia where Rudolf Hamburger had grown up, had been subjected to industrial scale ethnic cleansing and then transferred to Poland, compensating for the eastern part of Poland which now became part of the Soviet Union. The middle third of Germany was administered between 1945 and 1949 as the Soviet occupation zone and then relaunched as the Soviet sponsored German Democratic Republic (East Germany). Dresden where he had been a student was now in East Germany and it was to East Germany that his ex-wife had hastily relocated from her Oxfordshire village home at the end of 1949 when she thought she was about to be arrested by British intelligence. Following his release from his last labour camp in 1952/53 Rudolf Hamburger tried to re-establish contact with his old friends and colleagues in what was now the German Democratic Republic. He was able to enter into a correspondence with his ex-wife, but further contact outside the Soviet Union was not so easy. Former political prisoners were not permitted to contact friends and relatives outside the Soviet Union, and his correspondence was naturally monitored.

After his return to East Germany in 1955 the Ministry for State Security applied to their Soviet colleagues for a report on Hamburger in connection with his application for membership of East Germany's ruling Socialist Unity Party (SED). The report came back, "When he was living in the Rostov area as a released prisoner, Hamburger attempted illegally to contact living relatives and acquaintances living in the USA, England and East Germany. At the same time he was in regular contact by letter with his wife, Kutschinskaja alias Berton Ursula (sic), who resides in the East German sector of Berlin".

=== Homecoming ===
In February 1954, still in Kamensk, Rudolf Hamburger managed to get a letter through to Richard Paulick who had returned to East Berlin from Shanghai in 1949. Eighteen months earlier, in August/September 1952, the two former Poelzig student Richard Paulick and Kurt Liebknecht had travelled as part of a delegation of East German architects undertaking a round trip of the Soviet Union. The trip had taken them to Stalingrad, Rostov-on-Don and the Black Sea resort of Sochi. That meant they had been in the region where Rudolf Hamburger was living. At some stage Rudolf Hamburg picked up a copy of Pravda and read about the East German architects' visit. The article mentioned that Paulick was part of the delegation, indicating that he had now returned from China to the German Democratic Republic. This is what had prompted Hamburger's attempts, pursued with characteristic doggedness, to contact his old friend. It appears from surviving correspondence that Paulick's further letters to Hamburger while he was still in Kamensk were delivered as additions to letters from Ursula, his ex-wife, which seems to have increased the probability of delivery. There was a large amount of paper work to be organised in East Germany, which may have included restitution of his German nationality which had lapsed while he was in Switzerland in 1939. Between them Richard Paulick and Ursula Beurton (as she was, by this time, formally known) arranged Rudolf Hamburger's home-coming to the German Democratic Republic. Surviving correspondence indicates that Paulick and Hamburger both thought he would be able to return to East Germany, possibly via Moscow, in the early summer of 1954, but in the end it was only in July 1955 that he was back in East Germany. Rudolf Hamburger did not fit neatly into any of the "usual categories". The Soviets did not imprison him as a prisoner of war. He had never actually been a member of the Communist Party. He was not one of those who had emigrated as a political refugee directly from Nazi Germany to Moscow in the 1930s. The unexpected delay may very well have resulted from nothing more significant that the inability of the responsible bureaucrats to decide how to classify him.

=== German Democratic Republic ===
On his arrival in East Germany Hamburger lived, from 5 July 1955, as a tenant at the Berlin apartment of his friend Richard Paulick. He remained there only for a couple of weeks. By the middle of August he had taken a job as a Chief Architect with the Dresden city authorities. He immediately applied for membership of the ruling Socialist Unity Party ("Sozialistische Einheitspartei Deutschlands" / SED). That proved anything but easy to process, however. He needed to find two sponsors for his party membership and the Ministry for State Security needed to investigate him to make sure he did not have any guilty secrets in his history. There is no sign that Hamburger was ever anything other than firmly opposed to Nazism. However, he had lived outside Germany since 1930, and much of his more exotic international travel had been undertaken on behalf of Soviet intelligence: most of the "usual sources" on political involvement between 1930 and 1955 were not applicable or not accessible, even to East German state agencies. Initially he tried to obtain sponsorship for party membership from friends and former fellow students of architecture who had known him since they studied together in Berlin in the 1920s, but in the end it was his ex-wife (by now known most frequently as "Ursula Beurton" or by the pseudonym under which she was reinventing herself as an author, "Ruth Werner") whose information persuaded the authorities to progress his party membership application. (Note: Two marriage and a successful career as a spy mean that Rudolf Hamburger's wife / ex-wife may be identified in sources under any one of an unusually wide range of names: She was born in 1907 as Ursula Kuczynski; During her first marriage, between 1929 and 1939, she was Ursula Hamburger; As a Soviet agent active between 1930 and 1949 she was known by a variety of pseudonyms including, most commonly, Sonja / Sonya; During her second marriage, between 1940 and her death in 2000, she was known as Ursula Beurton. (The name Beurton is not always consistently spelled.); In or shortly before 1958 she launched herself as a successful author in East Germany, using the pseudonym Ruth Werner) Rudolf Hamburger received his card as a "candidate for party membership" in March 1956. In September 1956 the 135th meeting of the "Central Party Control Commission" dealt with review and verification of 19 comrades recently returned from the Soviet Union whose had been listed as candidate party members. For 18 of the 19 comrades the minutes of the session contain much detailed information on life histories, but for Rudolf Hamburger the information recorded is restricted to his address and one or two basic personal details. This may have reflected the sensitive nature of some of the relevant sources. Ministry for State Security files on Hamburger refer to information held by the Party Central Committee or "elsewhere", without spelling out more detail, beyond the high level statement that he was "active in the anti-fascist movement" and had been accepted for membership by the Party Central Committee. Rudolf Hamburger was accepted as a full party member in March 1958. Rudolf Hamburger made his home in Dresden.

Important projects he directed while employed by the city authorities in Dresden included the "Industry Project II" ("Industrieprojektierung Dresden II") (1956) and the Reed Processing Collective in Romania ("Schilfzellstoffkombinat in Rumänien"). In 1959 he started a new job, now working as deputy to his friend Richard Paulick on the major residential developments ("Aufbau der 2. Sozialistischen Wohnstadt") at Hoyerswerda, a large new town development a short distance to the east of Dresden. He retired, formally, in 1963. After that he took several lengthy trips as a passenger on freight ships. This enabled to revisit his old haunts in Shanghai, and to meet up again with his brothers Otto and Viktor. He also undertook one or two further architecture commissions, now on a freelance basis. The most important of these was refurbishment of the interior of the East German embassy in Pyongyang.

=== Taboo ===
Discussion of Rudolf Hamburger's life story was always a political taboo in East Germany. There was no wish on the part of the authorities to discuss the lengthy detention in Soviet labour camps of a German comrade whose political credentials were beyond reproach. Because of this, there was, in addition, never any public awareness or discussion of his pioneering work as an architect in Shanghai during the 1930s. Nevertheless, after he retired Rudolf Hamburger began to compile an autobiographical volume detailing his experiences between 1930 and 1955. He was, as he himself insisted, not a natural author, but he nevertheless had a compelling series of tales to tell. The detailed nature of what he wrote has led some to suggest that he had managed to keep and then to smuggle out notes of his experiences in Shanghai, Tehran, and then in the Soviet labour camps. Whether or not he had kept contemporaneous notes, the detailed nature of what he wrote down – not withstanding certain minor inconsistencies regarding dates – indicates that he was blessed with a formidable memory. Although there could be no question of publishing such a volume in East Germany, he did attempt to arrange for its publication in West Germany, but by the 1970s the fashion for "labour camp literature" was already passing, and a western publisher was not found at that time.

Ursula Kuczynski (Ruth Werner) had also performed her espionage activities under conditions of great secrecy till 1950, but after the trial of Klaus Fuchs it became impossible to pretend that she had not been a spy. She had, indeed, been an exceptionally effective spy. In 1977, using the pseudonym "Ruth Werner", Ursula published her autobiographical book "Sonjas Rapport" in East Germany. In most cases she avoided mention of people with whom she had worked who were still alive, and even when an "uncensored version" appeared in 2006, very many questions remained unanswered. His ex-wife's memoir nevertheless gave a remarkably candid insight into her espionage career after 1930. And in view of his close involvement, it had evidently been impossible for her to avoid including her first husband, Rudolf Hamburger, in the text. The book was a great commercial success. Several hundred thousand copies were sold. The East German authorities invited Rudolf Hamburger to exploit his new-found fame (if only as a bit-part player in his wife's success) by producing a volume of his own, but what was envisaged was a piece of propaganda controlled by the government, and Hamburger rejected the offer with an uncharacteristic absence of courtesy. He was nevertheless furious that Ursula's book concentrated on Ursula's espionage success. He felt that it unjustifiably played down his own contribution to their espionage partnership between 1930 and 1940. It may very well be that after this he redoubled his own work on an autobiographical work of his own, although there seemed very little prospect that it could ever be published.

=== Death and rehabilitation ===
Discussion of Rudolf Hamburger's life story was always a taboo in East Germany. More than thirty years after his death, by which time numerous other pieces of work touching in his remarkable career had appeared, Rudolf Hamburger's own autobiographical work was published by his son. The result was, in the words of one critic, "a discovery, and for the author a form of rehabilitation ... Although Hamburger, city-planner and architect, is no writer and never wanted to become one, his eyewitness report is great literature ... The book deals with many questions that the reader does not ask. But Hamburger's objective, to draw the reader closer to the truth about his experiences in the labour camps, is impressively achieved ... As a historical testimony the book is depressing, but it is also uplifting in its irrepressible hope for humanity."

Rudolf Hamburger died at Dresden on 1 December 1980. His body was buried in a place of honour in the city's Heidefriedhof (cemetery), close to the graves of Hans and Lea Grundig. Ten years later, as the Soviet Union approached the final flight path to implosion, Hamburger was posthumously rehabilitated by Moscow in 1990. Till now there had been powerful institutional barriers preventing Rudolf Hamburger's footprint from appearing in the historical record except as a footnote in his wife's remarkable story. After 1990 many of those institutional barriers had fallen away.

== A wider audience posthumously ==
In 2006 Eduard Kögel presented his doctoral dissertation on "Two of Poelzig's students who emigrated: Rudolf Hamburger and Richard Paulick, between Shanghai and East Berlin". As regards Rudolf Hamburger, the compilation drew together Hamburger's own unpublished drafts, numerous letters that he received and wrote, and various references to him in works on people with whom he had interacted between 1930 and 1955. The result was a coherent critical chronology. In 2013, more than three decades after Rudolf Hamburger's death, his own autobiographical work was finally published, with a lengthy introduction by Hamburger's son, the Shakespeare scholar Maik Hamburger, who is identified as producer of the volume.
