= Kačinskas =

- Lithuanian surname
- m.: Kačinskas
- f.: (unmarried): Kačinskaitė
- f.: (married): Kačinskienė

Kačinskas is a Lithuanian language family name. It corresponds to Polish language surname Kaczyński.

The surname may refer to:

- Jeronimas Kačinskas (1907–2005), Lithuanian composer
- Virgilijus Kačinskas (born 1959), Lithuanian politician
