= Heinrich Alexander Stoll =

- Born: Heinrich Joachim Friedrich Karl Hans Stoll; 8 December 1910; Parchim, Mecklenburg-Schwerin, Germany
- Died: 4 March 1977 (aged 66); Potsdam (Brandenburg), German Democratic Republic
- Education: "Friedrich-Franz Gymnasium" (Parchim); Erlangen; Rostock
- Occupations: Lutheran vicar (dismissed 1935); Writer; Editor-compiler
- Political party: LDPD (1945-1950)
- Parents: Heinrich Christian Stoll (father); Frieda Henriette Louise Wandschneider (mother)

Heinrich Alexander Stoll was the pen name used by the German writer Heinrich Joachim Friedrich Karl Hans Stoll (8 December 1910 - 4 March 1977). During the 1950s and 1960s he emerged in East Germany as a prolific author of adventure novels, historical novels and reworkings of ancient legends, along with short stories and science fiction works. There are nevertheless suggestions that the reality of his own experiences as a young man, during twelve years under Hitler followed by six years under Soviet military administration and the early years of the Ulbricht dictatorship, were a match for almost any novel.

== Life ==
Stoll was born in Parchim, a garrison town and market town a short distance inland from Schwerin and Rostock in the marshy flatlands of northern Germany. Heinrich Christian Stoll, his father, was a career soldier and, at the time he was born, a sergeant in the Second Great Ducal Mecklenburg Dragoon Regiment No. 18. (Heinrich Christian Stoll later became a railway official.) The infant was baptised a Protestant, after approximately six weeks, on 22 January 1911 in the parish and grew up, in Mecklenburg-Schwerin, the Grand Duchy of his birth. It was also in Parchim that he attended the local "Friedrich-Franz Gymnasium" (secondary school). He then enrolled in 1929 and 1932 successively at the Universities of Erlangen and of Rostock, studying both Protestant Theology and Art history, and graduating in 1933.

Stoll then served as a Lutheran vicar, his duties covering the parishes in and around Perlin bei Wittenburg, Ratzeburg, Neubukow and Wismar. For a young churchman the times had become acutely uncertain, following the coming to power in early 1933 of the Hitler government, quickly followed by the transformation of Germany into a one-party dictatorship. That involved creating a unified German Evangelical (i.e. Protestant) Church which could be formed into a nationalised German version of the Church of England. The move met with powerful opposition from within the Prussian Union of Churches and other groupings of protestant churches that had evolved without succumbing to any of the pressures to unify and consolidate implicit in the government's church strategy. The result was the emergence, between 1933 and 1935, of the Confessing Church, which quickly became an anti-government mass-movement. Members included many of those German protestants who had not voted for Hitler. Some of the most prominent members were those who were most appalled by the Racial policy of Nazi Germany. Evidently antisemitism was to be no mere populist device for shrill street politicians but a core underpinning of government strategy. Heinrich Alexander Stoll became a deeply engaged member of the Confessing Church. He was therefore suspended from ecclesiastical office in 1935 and subjected to an immediate - though possibly temporary - ban on preaching or officiating at church services. Despite the ban, he was not prevented from writing and publishing his first known book: "Theodor Kliefoth als Kirchenführer" was a biographical work on the nineteenth century church reformer from Mecklenburg, Theodor Kliefoth. This was published in 1936. The author was identified simply as "Heinrich Stoll". The next year he published another more modest book, "Capri, Traum und Leben, Tagebuch 1937".

Between 1937 and 1943 Heinrich Alexander Stoll lived abroad, undertaking what one source identifies as "longer stays" in Denmark, the Netherlands, Switzerland and Italy. Most sources are silent as to what he did during most of this period, but once he settled in Rome he supported himself through "small journalistic assignments [for] Swiss newspapers". Most Germans in Rome during this period were soldiers involved in fighting. Stoll was not one of these, but family papers that became available after 2017 indicate that he was in contact with the German embassy, evidently undertaking assignments that could be construed as "intelligence related". He also found time to write another novel: "Der Tod des Hypathos. Novelle" was published in Leipzig in 1942. By this time he was living in Rome, where he made a study of Classical archaeology and worked as a correspondent for foreign newspapers.

In July 1943, with an Anglo-American invasion from the south known to be imminent, the King of Italy had Mussolini arrested. For German military planners, the fall of Italian fascism was unwelcome, but it was not a surprise. Central and northern Italy were transformed into a German puppet state in September 1943. Germans who had hoped to avoid the reach of the German government by living out the war years in Italy, including Heinrich Alexander Stoll, were rounded up and forcibly repatriated. In or before 1944 Stoll found himself serving the German war effort through membership of a punishment battalion. During 1944 he was seriously wounded which ruled out further involvement in the fighting during the final part of the war. By the time war ended, in May 1945, he was a prisoner of war. His term of detention at this stage was relatively brief, however.

After the war he returned home to Parchim which was now being administered as part of the Soviet occupation zone. It was, in some ways, an unfortunate decision, since according to at least one source Parchim was the scene of "extreme Stalinist persecution" during the immediate post-war years. The same commentator asserts that, measured by the number of death sentences carried out as a proportion of the overall population, Parchim suffered more than anywhere else in the Soviet occupation zone, presumably reflecting decisions taken by local military commanders. Stoll was not executed; but nor was he unaffected. During 1945 he joined the Liberal Democratic Party, at this stage not yet subsumed into "bloc party" structure of what would become, within five years, a new kind of German one-party dictatorship. He also headed up the local branch of the rapidly evolving National Cultural Association. It was a position of some privilege and of some influence in the local community. In 1946 Stoll was arrested by the NKVD, on behalf of the local military administrators, possibly on account of some overheard injudicious remark.

Two years of detention in Special Camp No.9 at Fünfeichen (Neubrandenburg) followed. (Note: Before 1945 Camp Fünfeichen had been a prisoner of war camp, opened and constructed (partly by inmates) on the edge of town in 1939/40.) After his release Stoll was again engaged prominently in the activities of the local branch of the National Cultural Association at nearby Schwerin. In October 1949 the Soviet occupation zone was rebranded and relaunched as the Soviet sponsored German Democratic Republic (East Germany): it was an eventful year, also, for Stoll personally. In November of that year he was lured to West Berlin where he was arrested and taken into investigative custody on suspicion of espionage. Details are hazy. The incident seems to have originated with suspicions that Stoll had denounced the teacher (and later an author) Alexandra Wiese (1923–1995) to the security services, leading to Wiese's arrest. After being released he returned once more to Parchim, where former comrades from the LDPD and the Cultural Association now kept their distance. On 6 January 1950 Heinrich Alexander Stoll disappeared without a trace.

There was no trial, but it turned out that Stoll had been sentenced to ten years of hard labour in Siberia. Following the availability of hitherto undisclosed family papers, there recent hints have appeared that he could have become a focus of suspicion among the townsfolk on account of his homo-sexuality. It has never become entirely clear, however, why he had been singled out for detention: his subsequent historical-biographical novel on the lives of Heinrich Schliemann and Johann Joachim Winckelmann nevertheless offers up clues, hints and some persuasive narratives. It is not impossible that Stoll was suspected by his Soviet captors of involvement in espionage during and/or directly after the Hitler years. A fellow detainee in Usollag camp who became a friend was the German architect Rudolf Hamburger, a man with his own complicated connections to Soviet espionage dating back to the 1930s, when Hamburger and his wife lived (initially) in Shanghai. Hamburger's own posthumously published memoire of time in the Soviet camps offers intriguing insights into the lives the two men led at this time. After Stalin died, in March 1953, the political climate in the Soviet Union began to shift. An early indication of the changes to come was the release of large numbers inmates from the labour camps, among them many politically involved Germans who had for various reasons ended up in Soviet captivity during the fifteen years since 1938 and survived. Stoll and Hamburger were both released in 1953. It seems that Hamburger was obliged to remain in the Soviet Union for several more years, but Stoll was able to return to the German Democratic Republic that same year. He returned yet again to Parchim and re-embarked on his career as a free-lance author. During the next couple of decades he proved exceptionally prolific as a writer.

An unwelcome interruption came in 1957 when he was arrested on suspicion of fornication with minors towards the end of the year. He was released after two months in investigative detention. After this latest manifestation of hostility on the part of local officialdom he finally decided to leave Parchim, relocating in 1958 to Thyrow (Trebbin), near Potsdam, where he made his home between 1958 and his death in 1977:

== Personal ==
According to one source Stoll had only one sibling, a sister who died young. He never married and had no children. There were remoter kinsfolk with whom he was in good terms, however. His literary estate (and reputation) are currently tended by the retired forester Burkhard Unterdörfer who also inherited and lives in Stoll's former home. Unterdörfer recalls his adoptive "Uncle Alexander" with affection.

"He always bought me something when he came [to visit his friend and cousin and the speaker's father], and often surprised me .... and I remember, soon after I got my driver's licence, I drove with him to Poland in my parents' car .... I learned a whole lot, not just about art history, but also about how to handle difficult people .... when the car got stuck we spent the night in a field without problems. The next morning the farmer helped us again [apparently thanks to Stoll skills at negotiating away their presence in the field, in Polish, with a potentially indignant farmer]". (Note: "Er hat mir immer was mitgebracht, wenn er kam, und überraschte mich oft .... Und ich erinnere mich, dass ich mit ihm kurz nach Erhalt meines Führerscheins mit dem Auto meiner Eltern nach Polen gefahren bin .... Nicht nur kulturhistorisch habe ich eine Menge gelernt, auch im Umgang mit einem schwierigen Menschen .... als wir mit dem Auto steckengeblieben sind, haben wir problemlos auf dem Feld übernachtet. Am nächsten Morgen half uns dann ein Bauer weiter, auch das war Stoll".)

Heinrich Alexander Stoll himself was a private man, who lived alone and spoke little of himself. Burkhard Unterdörfer, who probably knew him better than anyone else still alive half a century after Stoll's death, is unhesitating in identifying what he saw as the high point of his life: in 1966 Stoll enjoyed the privilege of a private audience with the pope (who had, like him, spent most of the war years living mostly out of sight in Rome).

== Output (selection) ==
- Theodor Kliefoth als Kirchenführer, Göttingen 1936 (under the name Heinrich Stoll)
- Capri, Göttingen 1937
- Der Tod des Hypathos. Novelle, Leipzig 1942 (Note: set in the reign of the emperor Tiberius Iulius Caesar Augustus)
- Rebellion um Leveke, Leipzig 1955
- Der gute Plon, Berlin 1956 (with Klaus Hallacz)
- Die Schlangenkrone, Berlin 1956 (with Klaus Hallacz)
- Der Traum von Troja, Leipzig 1956
- Vom Räuber Viting und andere Sagen aus Mecklenburg und dem Spreewald, Berlin 1956 (with Klaus Hallacz)
- Scherzo, Leipzig 1957
- Deutsche Heldensagen, Berlin
  - vol. 1. Dietrich von Bern, 1958
  - vol. 2. Kudrun und Nibelungen, 1960
- Der stralsundische Ratskutscher und andere deutsche Sagen, Berlin 1958 (with Klaus Hallacz)
- Der Zauberer von San Silvestro, Berlin 1959
- Die Höhle am Toten Meer, Berlin 1960
- Laternenballade, Leipzig 1960
- Winckelmann, seine Verleger und seine Drucker, Berlin 1960
- Griechische Tempel, Leipzig 1961
- Die Brücke am Janiculus, Berlin 1962
- Johann Heinrich Voß, Berlin
  - vol. 1. Der Junge aus Penzlin, 1962
  - vol. 2. Der Löwe von Eutin, 1966
- Noch lebt der Hecht, Rostock 1962
- Der Ring des Etruskers, Berlin 1963
- Götter und Giganten, Berlin 1964
- Die Antike in Stichworten, Leipzig 1966 (with Gerhard Löwe)
- Der Hexenbaum von Ulrichshusen, Berlin 1967
- Tod in Triest, Berlin 1968
- Stralsundische Geschichten, Berlin 1972
- Begegnungen im Zuge, Berlin 1981
