= Virgilijus =

Virgilijus is a Lithuanian masculine given name and may refer to:

- Virgilijus Alekna (b. 1972), Lithuanian discus thrower
- Virgilijus Vladislovas Bulovas (born 1939), Lithuanian engineer and politician
- Virgilijus Noreika (born 1935), Lithuanian tenor
- Virgilijus Juozas Čepaitis (b. 1937), Lithuanian publisher and translator
- Virgilijus Kačinskas (born 1959), Lithuanian politician
