= Len Beurton =

English Communist and Soviet spy (1914 – 1997

- Born: Leon Charles Beurton; 19 February 1914; Barking, Essex, England
- Died: 29 October 1997 (aged 83); Berlin, Germany
- Occupation: Soviet intelligence agent
- Political party: Communist
- Spouse: Ursula Kuczynski
- Children: Peter John Beurton

Leon Charles Beurton (19 February 1914 – 29 October 1997) was an English Communist who worked as an agent for the Soviet intelligence services (Main Intelligence Directorate / Гла́вное разве́дывательное управле́ние).

Many details of his activity remain uncertain, but it is known that he became, on 23 February 1940, the second husband of his co-worker Ursula Kuczynski, whose own public profile in English language sources is relatively well rehearsed thanks to her espionage work involving Klaus Fuchs.

Like many who make their careers in espionage, Beurton appears in sources with a number of different names. At the time of his birth he was Leon Charles Beurton. His first name appears variously as Len, Leon and Leonard, while his family name may be shown as Beuston, Benston or Brewer.

== Life ==
Beurton was born in Barking, then just outside London on its east side. His father, who at one stage worked as a waiter, also called Leon Beurton, had been born in France, but he had taken British nationality and, round about the time his son was born, married Florence S. Smith. However, the father abandoned his wife soon after Leon's birth. Leon was adopted by a family called Fenton, which was another name that he would sometimes use. During the 1930s he was described as "an automobile engineer by trade".

In 1936 or 1937 he joined the International Brigades to participate in the Spanish Civil War, fighting in support of the Republican side. He stayed in Spain till December 1938.

In 1939 he was sent to Switzerland. At some stage he had been recruited to work as an agent for the Soviet intelligence services, probably by a fellow Communist called Brigite Kuczynski. In Switzerland he worked with another of Brigitte's recruits Alexander Foote in an espionage cell led by Brigitte's better documented sister, Ursula Kuczynski, based in the village of Caux, then a three-hour hike up into the hills behind Lake Geneva. Ursula Kuczynski took the opportunity to share with Beurton and Foote her critically important radio operating skills. Foote was known to colleagues at this time under the cover name "Jim" while Len Beurton was operating as "Jack" and sometimes as "John Miller". He also used Ursula's genuine (albeit pre-marriage) family name, Kuczynski.

By or during 1940 he became the chief cipher expert in the Alexander "Sándor" Radó spy network, and he is thought to have been a key figure in the mysterious "Red Three" spy-ring (sometimes identified in US and UK sources as the "Lucy" or "Red chapel" group).

On 23 February 1940 Leon Beurton married, as her second husband, Ursula Kuczynski. Moscow had told Ursula of plans by Germany to invade Switzerland, and she knew that as a Communist Jewish exile from Nazi Germany she would already have been listed for immediate arrest by the Nazi regime following such an invasion. She was instructed to divorce her first husband, Rudolf Hamburger, and marry one of her English co-agents in order to obtain a British passport: Foote had declined the honour, and Moscow assured Kuczynski that if she married the younger man she could divorce Beurton once she had her British passport. As matters turned out, however, the marriage would last more than fifty years. In December 1940 Mrs. Beurton relocated from Switzerland to Britain, arriving, on 4 January 1941 accompanied by her two children. Her father had been living in England, since 1933, and initially she stayed with him at her parents' Oxford home in the Woodstock Road. Beurton nevertheless remained in Switzerland, presumably supporting Sándor Radó's espionage work, for another couple of years. Len Buerton himself returned to Britain, traveling via neutral Portugal, in July 1942, using a passport he had obtained from somewhere in the name of "John Miller". For the rest of the 1940s he would live with his wife at a succession of addresses in Oxfordshire, where on 8 September 1943 Ruth Beurton (as the neighbours knew her) gave birth to their son, Peter John Beurton.

Following the birth of his son Beurton voluntarily joined the British army. War ended, formally in May 1945, following which, during 1945/46 he served as a member of the British army of occupation in Berlin. Back in Oxfordshire, in 1948 he took a machining job in Chipping Norton. During this period he continued to work with his wife on their espionage work for the Soviet Union.

In March 1950 his wife left England for Germany, telling neighbours that she needed to sort out the affairs of her parents, German refugees from Nazi persecution who had both died in England in 1947. She took the children with her, but left Len behind because, as she explained, he had a broken leg. Nevertheless, he joined his wife in Berlin a few months later, in July 1950: their Oxfordshire home was "sold up". In November 1950 Klaus Fuchs, under interrogation by the British Intelligence Services, identified Ursula Beurton as his contact with the Soviets. The information seeped into the public domain more gradually, at least till the later 1970s when Ursula started publishing her memoirs.

From the end of 1950 till his death in 1997 Leon Beurton lived with his wife in the German Democratic Republic and its successor state, working for some years with the ADN news agency. During his final years he was stricken with Parkinson's disease. He became blind, lame, deaf, and increasingly frail and dependent for his day to day survival on his wife who had, in the meantime, retired from espionage and reinvented herself as a successful author.
