= Ryszard Kaczyński =

Polish politician

member of Sejm 2005-2007
- In office 25 September 2005 – ?

Personal details
- Born: 25 December 1954 (age 71) Wejherowo, Poland
- Party: Independent

Ryszard Kaczyński (born 25 December 1954) is a Polish politician. He was elected to the Sejm on 25 September 2005, getting 7750 votes in 26 Gdynia district as a candidate from the Law and Justice list.

== See also ==
- Members of Polish Sejm 2005-2007
