= Kuciński =

Kucinski or Kuciński (feminine: Kucińska; plural: Kucińscy) is a Polish surname. It may occur as a variant of Kuczyński from Kuczyn, or as a locational surname for Kuciny. Notable people with the surname include:

- Ana Kucinski (1942–1974), Brazilian activist
- Benjamin Kuciński (born 1982), Polish race walker
- Bernardo Kucinski (born 1937), Brazilian journalist and political scientist
- Ewa Kucińska (born 1962), Polish diver
- Zbigniew Kuciński, Polish boxer
- Zuzanna Kucińska (born 1994), Polish volleyball player

== See also ==
- Kuczynski
