= Ursula Kuczynski =

German spy and author (1907–2000)

Ruth Werner
- Born: Ursula Maria Kuczynski; 15 May 1907; Schöneberg, Berlin, Germany
- Died: 7 July 2000 (aged 93); Berlin, Germany
- Occupations: Spy, writer
- Political party: KPD (1926); SED (1950)
- Spouses: Rudolf Hamburger (m. 1929; div. 1939) Leon Charles Beurton (m. 1940; died 1997)
- Children: 3, including Maik Hamburger

Ursula Kuczynski (15 May 1907 – 7 July 2000), also known as Ruth Werner, Ursula Beurton and Ursula Hamburger, was a German Communist activist who spied for the Soviet Union during the 1930s and 1940s, most famously as the handler of nuclear scientist Klaus Fuchs. She moved to East Germany in 1950 when Fuchs was unmasked, and published a series of books related to her espionage activities, including her bestselling autobiography, Sonjas Rapport.

Sources concerned with her espionage work in the 1930s/40s sometimes use the cover name originally suggested to her in Shanghai by her fellow intelligence operative and lover Richard Sorge: "Sonja", "Sonja Schultz" or, after she moved to Britain, "Sonya".

== Life ==
=== Early years ===
Ursula Maria Kuczynski was born in Schöneberg, Berlin, Prussia, German Empire on 15 May 1907, the second of the six children of the economist and demographer Robert René Kuczynski and his wife Berta Kuczynski (née Gradenwitz), a painter. The family was a secular Jewish one. Ursula had four younger sisters: Brigitte (born 1910), Barbara (born 1913), Sabine (born 1919) and Renate (born 1923), and an older brother, Jürgen (born 1904), who would later become a historian-economist with a controversial relationship of his own with the espionage community.

The children were academically gifted, and the household was prosperous, employing a cook, a gardener, two household servants and a nanny, Olga Muth. Ursula grew up in a small villa on the Schlachtensee lake in the Zehlendorf borough in the southwest of Berlin. When she was eleven she landed a screen role in The House of Three Girls (1918), the cinema version of Das Dreimäderlhaus.

Ursula attended the Lyzeum (secondary school) in Zehlendorf and then, between 1924 and 1926, undertook an apprenticeship as a book dealer. She had already, in 1924, joined the left-leaning Free Employees league (AfA-Bund), and 1924 was also the year in which she joined the Young Communists (KJVD) and Germany's Red Aid (Rote Hilfe). In May 1926, the month of her nineteenth birthday, Ursula Kuczynski joined the Communist Party of Germany (KPD).

=== Librarianship, marriage and politics ===
In 1926 and 1927, she attended a librarianship academy while working at a lending library. She then took a job at Ullstein Verlag, a large Berlin publishing house. However, she lost this job in 1928 after participating in a May-Day Demonstration and/or on account of her Communist Party membership. Between December 1928 and August 1929 she worked in a New York book shop before returning to Berlin where she married Rudolf Hamburger, an architect and fellow member of the Communist Party. It was also at this time that she set up the Marxist Workers' Library (MAB) in Berlin. She headed up the MAB between August 1929 and June 1930.

=== Espionage ===
==== China ====
With her husband, Ursula relocated, in July 1930, to Shanghai, where a frenetic construction boom afforded ample opportunities for Hamburger's architectural work. She would remain based in China till 1935. It was here that the couple's son, the Shakespeare scholar Maik Hamburger, was born in February 1931. After they had been in Shanghai for a little more than four months she was introduced by the American journalist Agnes Smedley, to another German expatriate, Richard Sorge, an agent of the Fourth Department of the Red Army, responsible for military intelligence, posing as a journalist. "Sonja" (the code name by which Kuczynski was known) operated a Russian spy ring under Sorge's direction. In Shanghai, she also met Roger Hollis, who later became the director of MI5, and Manfred Stern, who had run a spy network in the United States and was now a military advisor to the Chinese Communist Party.

In Fall 1931, Ursula sent her son Michael to live with her husband's parents (now relocated from Germany to Czechoslovakia) while she went to Moscow, where she undertook a seven-month training session before returning to China. There had been a concern that if baby Michael had accompanied her to Moscow he might inadvertently have blown her cover later by blurting out words in Russian. It was also during this period that she was trained in various practical aspects of spy-craft. This included radio operator skills that were much prized in the world of espionage: she learned to build and operate a radio receiver, becoming an exceptionally capable and accurate user of Morse code. For her next assignment, she was teamed up with Johann Patra, codenamed "Ernst".

Between March and December 1934, they were based in Shenyang in Manchuria which had been under Japanese military occupation since the Mukden Incident in 1931. In April 1935, one of their agents was arrested by the Japanese, and they were ordered to relocate to Peking. The following month, the Shanghai Municipal Police Special Branch arrested Yakov Grigoryevich Bronin, Sorge's successor in China. When his apartment was searched, evidence was found that his typewriter had been purchased by Ursula. As a result, her husband Rudolf was questioned by the Special Branch. The Fourth Department decided to redeploy Rudolf and Ursula to Poland. En route, she visited her family in England, where they had fled after the Nazi Party's rise to power. While stationed in Manchuria, Ursula and Patra had a romance that resulted in the birth of her daughter Janina in April 1936. Her husband Rudolf generously acknowledged "Nina" as though she were his own daughter.

==== Poland ====
In September 1935, they were both posted to Poland where, apart from at least one more lengthy visit to Moscow, they would remain till Autumn 1938. The couple lived mostly in the Polish capital Warsaw during this time and carried out espionage to assist underground Polish communists, apart when Ursula carried out a from a three-month mission in the Free City of Danzig. in 1936. In a ceremony in Moscow on 15 June 1937, Mikhail Kalinin presented her with the Order of the Red Banner for her espionage work in China. This was the time of the Great Purge and while she was in Moscow, many of her associates were imprisoned and executed.She was now a major in the Red Army, despite never having worn a uniform.

==== Switzerland ====
Between Autumn 1938 and December 1940, as agent "Sonja Schultz", Ursula was based in Switzerland, where she was one of the Red Three network, with Sándor Radó. Her duties included working as a specialist radio operator, applying technical skills acquired during her Moscow visits earlier in the decade. The codes she used to send information to Moscow from her house in Caux, a three-hour walk up into the mountains above Montreux, have never been deciphered. In Switzerland, she collaborated with the Lucy spy ring and was involved in recruiting agents to be infiltrated into Germany. She also ran her own ring, with agents that included Alexander Foote and Len Beurton.

==== England ====
Ursula's marriage to Rudolf Hamburger finally ended after he paid her a brief visit in Switzerland to say farewell before returning to China with Johann Patra. She obtained a divorce on the spurious grounds that Hamburger had committed adultery with one of her sisters, on 26 October 1939, and married Len Buerton on 23 February 1940, Defender of the Fatherland Day. One motive for this was to obtain a British passport to enable her to escape from Switzerland, which was now all but surrounded by fascist Germany and Italy. She applied for the passport on the day after the wedding. Betrayed by their nanny, Olga Muth, Ursula handed over her radio transmitter to Foote, and left Switzerland in December 1940. Buerton had to remain behind; as a former member of the International Brigades, he was refused permission to transit Spain. Travelling via Vichy France and Spain, Ursula and the children reached Portugal on Christmas Day. On 14 January 1941, they boarded the SS Avoceta, which reached Liverpool on 4 February. Beurton did not join them in the UK until 30 July 1942, having obtained a fake British passport from MI6 in return for information about Radó's spy ring.

Her second son was born in the late summer of 1943. They had settled in north Oxford, but soon moved on to the first of a succession of nearby villages, settling initially in Glympton, and then in Kidlington. In May 1945, the Beurtons relocated again, to a larger house in the north Oxfordshire village of Great Rollright where they remained until 1950, becoming so integrated into the village community that both her parents, who were frequent visitors in Oxfordshire even after the war ended, and who both died in 1947, are buried in the Great Rollright churchyard. In each Oxfordshire property in which she lived, Ursula installed a radio receiver and transmitter, which during the Second World War was illegal.

Living in Oxfordshire placed them conveniently close to her parents who had emigrated to London after 1933, and were then living with friends in Oxford because of the air raids in London. The Beurtons' Oxfordshire village homes were close to Blenheim Palace, where a large part of the MI5 had been relocated at the start of the Second World War, and the UK's Atomic Research Centre at Harwell, which was established in 1947. From 1942, she worked as a courier for the USSR's "Atomic spies", Klaus Fuchs and Melita Norwood. Ursula thus hastened the development of the Soviet atomic bomb, successfully tested in 1949. She was the GRU handler for an officer of the Royal Air Force and J. B. S. Haldane, a British specialist in submarine radar. She was also able to pass to her Soviet employers information from her brother, her father, and other exiled Germans in England. It was her brother Jürgen Kuczynski, an internationally respected economist, who originally recruited Fuchs to spy for the Soviets, and supplied her with reports from the United States Strategic Bombing Survey.

Together with Erich Henschke, she worked on infiltrating German Communist exiles into the US Office of Strategic Services (OSS). By Autumn 1944, the Americans were at this time preparing "Operation Hammer" for parachuting UK-based German exiles into Germany. Ursula was able to ensure that a substantial number of the OSS agents parachuted into Germany were reliable communists, able and willing to make inside intelligence available not merely to the OSS, but also to Moscow.

Many years later Ursula recalled that she was twice visited by MI5 representatives in 1947, and asked about her links with Soviet intelligence, which she refused to discuss. Her communist sympathies were no secret, but British suspicions were insufficiently supported by evidence to justify her arrest. Her visitors were unaware of or unconcerned by her periodic, and apparently casual, meetings with Fuchs in Nethercote, Banbury or on country cycle rides. At that time the British intelligence services seem to have been disinclined to follow up their concerns. Two years later detonation of the first Soviet atomic bomb refocused priorities within MI5, however. Fuchs was arrested towards the end of 1949; in January 1950 he was put on trial and confessed that he was a spy. The day before his trial started, fearing that she was about to be unmasked, Ursula left England. In March 1950, after two decades away from the city of her birth, she returned to Berlin. Meanwhile, Fuchs finally identified her as his Soviet contact in November 1950. The espionage-related aspects of her friendship with Melita Norwood only began to emerge in 1999.

=== Back in the GDR ===
Germany had changed. Ursula Beurton returned to East Berlin, in what had been the Soviet occupation zone and was now becoming the German Democratic Republic, in October 1949. A systematic nation building process had been underway for several years before 1949, starting with the arrival from Moscow of 30 well prepared formerly exiled German communists in Berlin at the start of May 1945, led by Walter Ulbricht. The Communist Party of Germany had been merged in April 1946 with the East German elements of the Social Democratic Party (SPD), to form the Socialist Unity Party of Germany (SED / Sozialistische Einheitspartei Deutschlands). On her arrival in East Berlin, Beurton joined the SED. She also resigned from the GRU. After undertaking journalism and other writing work, she became an author. In 1950, she was appointed head of the Capitalist Countries Division in the Central Department of Foreign Information in the Government Information Office. She was later fired, reportedly because she forgot to lock a safe door. Between 1953 and 1956 she worked in the Chamber of Commerce for foreign trade.

Some published works

as Ursula Beurton:

- Immer unterwegs. Reportage aus Prag über die Tätigkeit unserer Ingenieure im Ausland. Verlag Die Wirtschaft: Berlin 1956

as Ruth Werner:

- Ein ungewöhnliches Mädchen. Verlag Neues Leben: Berlin 1958
- Olga Benario. Die Geschichte eines tapferen Lebens. Verlag Neues Leben: Berlin 1961
- Über hundert Berge. Verlag Neues Leben: Berlin 1965
- Ein Sommertag. Verlag Neues Leben: Berlin 1966
- In der Klinik. Verlag Neues Leben: Berlin 1968
- Muhme Mehle. Neuauflage: Spotless: Berlin 2000
- Kleine Fische – Große Fische. Publizistik aus zwei Jahrzehnten. Verlag Neues Leben: Berlin 1972
- Die gepanzerte Doris. Kinderbuchverlag: Berlin 1973
- Ein sommerwarmer Februar. Kinderbuchverlag: Berlin 1973
- Der Gong des Porzellanhändlers. Verlag Neues Leben: Berlin 1976
- Vaters liebes gutes Bein. Kinderbuchverlag: Berlin 1977
- Gedanken auf dem Fahrrad. Verlag Neues Leben: Berlin 1980
- Kurgespräche. Verlag Neues Leben: Berlin 1988
- Sonjas Rapport. (autobiografical) First "complete" German language edition, Verlag Neues Leben (Eulenspiegel Verlagsgruppe) 2006 (original "censored" edition 1977), ISBN 3-355-01721-3

==== The writer ====
Her short (64 page) publication "Immer unterwegs. Reportage aus Prag über die Tätigkeit unserer Ingenieure im Ausland" was published under the name "Ursula Beurton" in Berlin in 1956.

Between 1958 and 1988, she produced a succession of books under the name by which she subsequently came to be known, Ruth Werner. Most were story books for children or suitably expurgated memoirs of her time in espionage. Her autobiography appeared in East Germany under the title "Sonjas Rapport" (Sonya's Report) and became a bestseller. There was no mention of Klaus Fuchs, who was still alive in 1976 and, presumably for the same reason, no mention of Melita Norwood. An English language version appeared in 1991 and a Chinese translation in 1999. An uncensored German language version came out only in 2006, although many questions were still left unanswered.

In 1982 Ruth Werner became a member of the East German affiliate of PEN International.

=== Die Wende ===
As the existence of the German Democratic Republic came to an end in the late 1980s, Ruth Werner was one of the few to defend it. On 10 November 1989, immediately after The Wall was breached, she addressed tens of thousands of people at a meeting in the Berlin Lustgarten (pleasure park) on the subject of her faith in Socialism with a human face.

She seems never to have regretted or seen the need to apologize for her espionage. In 1956, when Nikita Khrushchev made public the darker face of Communist Russia under Stalin, she was invited to comment. She was reluctant to join the criticism of the Soviet wartime leader:

It was not always easy [for the Soviet authorities] to differentiate between the mistakes of honest comrades and the actions of imperialist opponents. With so many guilty people it could certainly happen that the innocent became caught up. (Es war nicht immer leicht zwischen Fehlern ehrlicher Genossen und Taten des imperialistischen Gegners zu unterscheiden. Bei so vielen Schuldigen konnte es schon geschehen, dass auch Unschuldige mitbetroffen waren.)

She died in Berlin on 7 July 2000. Interviewed that year, a few months before her death, she was asked about the consequences of "Die Wende", the changes which had led to German reunification (which many of her persuasion still saw as a peaceful annexation of East Germany by West Germany):

The so-called "Wende" does not change my own view of how the world should be. But it does create in me a certain hopelessness, which I never had before. (Die sogenannte Wende wirkt sich nicht auf meine Weltanschauung aus. Aber es macht sich eine gewisse Hoffnungslosigkeit breit, wie ich sie vorher noch nie gehabt habe.)

== Evaluation ==
Since 1989, more information has become available concerning at least some of her espionage achievements, and appreciation of Ursula's exceptional abilities has grown. In the opinion of one historian who has studied her career, she was "one of the top spies ever produced by the Soviet Union and her penetration of Britain's secrets and MI5 possibly went far deeper than was thought at the time she was operational". An unidentified GRU chief is reported to have observed during the war, "If we had five Sonyas in England, the war would end sooner". She could be more reticent about her contribution: "I was simply working as a messenger" ("Ich arbeitete ja bloß als Kurier".)

What is incontrovertible is that Ursula engaged in an exceptionally high-risk trade on behalf of Stalin's Intelligence machine without being shot by the enemy or sent to the Gulag by her own side. Her first husband, Rudolf Hamburger, who also worked for Soviet intelligence, fell foul of the Soviet regime in 1943 and was deported to the Gulag. He was released in 1952 but remained officially "banned" and was sent to Ukraine, only being permitted to return to East Germany in 1955. This type of experience was far from unusual among Soviet spies. Alexander Radó, with whom she had worked closely in the hills above Geneva, also spent long years in the Gulag. Richard Sorge, who recruited her to work for Moscow in the first place, was caught and hanged by the Japanese.

As far as her story has come into the public domain, Ursula suffered nothing more harrowing than a couple of pointed but ultimately inconclusive meetings with British Intelligence agents in 1947. She was able to escape to East Germany before her espionage activities became the subject of any trial or other retributive process. Simple survival represented a considerable achievement under the circumstances of her two decades in espionage, and seems to justify the media epithets she attracted to the effect that she was "Stalin's best female spy" ("Stalins beste Spionin").

== Awards and honours ==
- 1937 Order of the Red Banner
- 1969 Order of the Red Banner
- 1978 National Prize of the German Democratic Republic
- 1978 Order of Karl Marx
- 1982 Patriotic Order of Merit
- 1986 Jubilee Medal "Forty Years of Victory in the Great Patriotic War 1941–1945"
- 1987 Patriotic Order of Merit Gold clasp
- 1990 Order of Friendship (awarded posthumously)

== Notes ==
Green, John. A Political Family: The Kuczynskis, Fascism, Espionage and The Cold War (Routledge Studies in Radical History and Politics) 2017
