= Virgilijus Kačinskas =

Lithuanian politician

Virgilijus Kačinskas (born May 25, 1959 in Vilnius) is a Lithuanian politician. In 1990 he was among those who signed the Act of the Re-Establishment of the State of Lithuania.
