= Kulczyński =

Kulczyński (feminine: Kulczyńska, plural: Kulczyńscy) is a Polish surname. Notable people with the surname include:

- Stanisław Kulczyński (1895–1975), Polish botanist and politician
- Władysław Kulczyński (1854–1919), Polish zoologist
