= Robert René Kuczynski =

German economist, demographer, and one of the founders of modern vital statistics

- Born: 12 August 1876; Berlin, German Empire
- Died: 25 November 1947 (aged 71); Oxford, England
- Education: University of Freiburg; University of Strasbourg; LMU Munich (PhD, 1897)
- Known for: Kuczynski rates, figures on the extent of the slave trade
- Scientific career
- Fields: Economist, demographer
- Workplaces: Handelshochschule Berlin; Brookings Institution; London School of Economics; Colonial Office
- Doctoral advisor: Lujo Brentano

Robert René Kuczynski (1876–1947) was a left-wing German economist and demographer and is said to be one of the founders of modern vital statistics.

== Early life ==
His father Wilhelm was a successful banker; his mother Lucy (née Brandeis) a progressive thinker who grew up in Paris in exile among French and German intellectuals. Robert married Berta Gradenwitz in 1903. Berta's father was a successful property developer and estate agent in Berlin. Against this wealthy family background, Robert took a decidedly different path as an academic who allied himself with the working class. René studied at the universities of Freiburg, Strasbourg and Munich where completed his doctoral dissertation in 1897 under Lujo Brentano.

== Career ==
He moved to the United States in 1899 for an internship at the United States Census Bureau and then worked at the US Bureau of Labor Statistics. During this time, he cultivated contacts with people like Eugene V. Debs. He returned to Germany in late 1903, and In 1904 he became director of the Statistical Office in Elberfeld and in 1906 took the same position in Berlin-Schöneberg. He became a strong supporter of the Social Democratic Party of Germany and knew many of its leaders personally.

He studied rent and income in Berlin before the First World War and found that 600,000 people lived in flats which house five or more people per room.

In 1926, Kuczynski chaired the Kuczynski Committee, working with the German League for Human Rights, which organized the campaign for a referendum on the expropriation of the Prussian landed aristocracy during the Weimar Republic.

In 1928 he led the German delegation to the tenth anniversary of the Russian Revolution.

In 1933, after Hitler had come to power, Kuczynski left Germany and went with around 20,000 books (half of the large family library) to Great Britain. There he lectured at the London School of Economics and became an adviser for the British Colonial Office. His most noted work was in the 1930s when he published figures on the extent of the slave trade between Africa and the Americas over the preceding three centuries. His figure of 15 million slaves became widely used by other researchers, but is no longer thought to be correct.

== Family ==
Kuczynski and wife Berta Gradenwitz had six children, among them the GDR-economist Jürgen Kuczynski, Brigitte Kuczynski, and the Soviet spy and author Ursula Kuczynski. The youngest, Renate, wrote the first history of the PhD degree in England.

== Works ==
- Kuczynski R., Munchner Volkswirtschaftliche Studien, Vierundzwanzigstes Stuck 1897
- Kuczynski R., Der Zug Nach Der Stadt: Statistische Studien Uber Vorg Nge Der Bevolkerungsbewegung Im Deutschen Reiche, 1897
- Lujo Brentano and Robert Kuczynski, Die heutige Grundlage der deutschen Wehrkraft. 1900
- Kuczynski R., Das Existenzminimum und verwandte Fragen.1912
- Kuczynski R., Arbeitslohn und Arbeitszeit in Europa und Amerika 1870–1909, Springer, 1913
- Kuczynski R., Unsere Finanzen nach dem Kriege, Springer Verlag Gmbh, Jan 1917
- Kuczynski R., Der Pflichtteil des Reiches, Springer, Berlin, 1917
- Kuczynski R., Schulden, Steuern und Valuta, Verlag Hans Robert Engelmann, Berlin, 1920
- Kuczynski R., Wiedergutmachung und deutsche Wirtschaft, Verlag Hans Robert Engelmann, Berlin, 1921
- Kuczynski R., Ein Ausweg. Gesundung der Wirtschaft durch Gesundung der Reichsfinanzen, Verlag von Hans Robert Engelmann, Berlin 1921
- Kuczynski R., Deutschlands Versorgung mit pflanzlichen Nahrungs- und Futtermitteln, J.F. Bergmann-Verlag, Jan 1926
- Kuczynski R., Statistische Grundlagen zu Deutschlands Versorgung mit Nahrungs- und Futtermitteln, J.F. Bergmann-Verlag, Jan 1926
- Kuczynski R., Deutschlands Versorgung mit tierischen Nahrungs- und Futtermitteln, J.F. Bergmann-Verlag Jan 1927
- Kuczynski, Robert René; American Loans to Germany, With the Aid of the Council and Staff of the Institute of Economics in Washington, 378 pages, publisher: The Macmillan Company, New York, September 1927
- Kuczynski, Robert René; Banker's Profits from German loans, publisher: The Brookings Institution, First Edition, Institute of Economics in Washington, Publication 41, 228 Seiten Washington,1932.
- Kuczynski R., The Measurement of Population Growth; Methods and Results, Sidgwick & Jackson, Ltd., London 1935
- Kuczynski R., Colonial population, Oxford University Press London, 1937
- Kuczynski R., Living-Space and Population Problems Clarendon Press, London. 1939
- Kuczynski R., Demographic Survey of the British Colonial Empire: Vol III. West Indian and American Territories Oxford University Press, London, 1953
- Kuczynski R., Fertility and reproduction : methods of measuring the balance of births and deaths.,
- Kuczynski R., The Balance of Births and Deaths; Volume I (1): Western and Northern Europe & Volume II (2): Eastern and Southern Europe (The Brookings Institution Reprint Series) 1970

== Sources ==
- Chapter 1 of The Final Victims : Foreign Slave Trade to North America, 1783–1810 by James A. McMillin, USC Press 2004, ISBN 1-57003-546-6
- Excerpt from Demography as Policy Science in the British Empire, 1918-1969 Karl Ittmann in Journal of Policy History - Volume 15, Number 4, 2003, pp. 417–448
- Obituary in Journal of the Royal Statistical Society, Vol. 110, No. 4. (1947), pp. 383–384
- A radical democrat and a great demographer: for the 125th birthday of René Kuczynski, by Thomas Kuczynski, Radical Statistics #112, 2015:70-75.
- John Green. A Political Family: The Kuczynskis, Fascism, Espionage and The Cold War (Routledge Studies in Radical History and Politics) 2017
