= Havemann =

Surname list

Havemann is a German surname. Notable people with the surname include:

- Florian Havemann (born 1952), German writer, painter, composer and judge
- Gustav Havemann (1882–1960), German violinist
- Katja Havemann (born 1947), German activist and writer
- Robert Havemann (1910–1982), East German chemist and dissident
- Sara Hagemann (born 1979), Danish academic and expert on European politics
