= Matula =

Matula may refer to:

- Matula (surname)
- Matula (1941 film), a film by Tan Tjoei Hock
- Matula (2017 film), a 2017 television film
- Matula, uroscopy flask
