= Ulrike Krumbiegel =

German actress

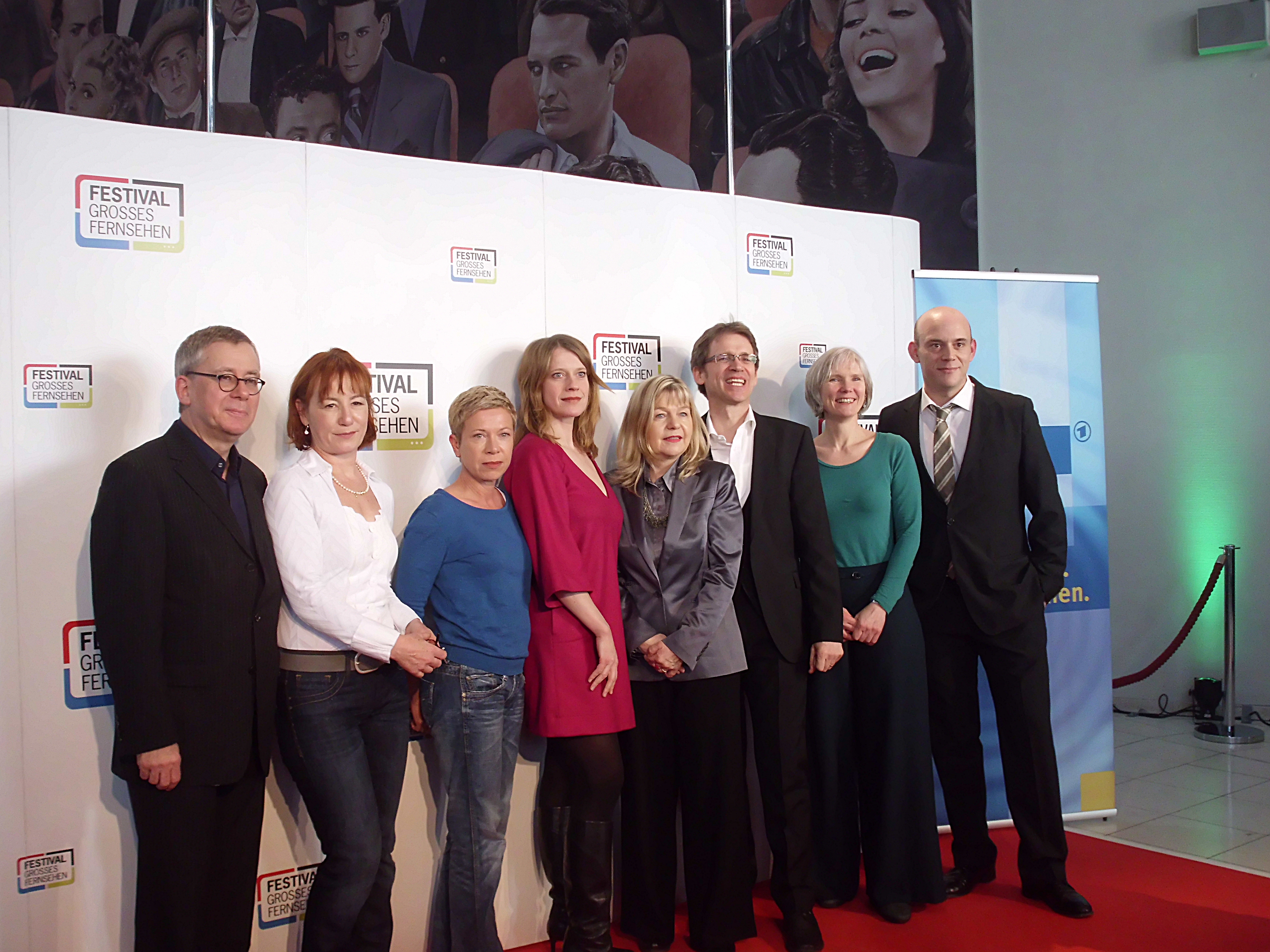
- Ulrike Krumbiegel (2 from left) at the Great TV Festival 2013
- Born: 16 December 1961 (age 64); East Berlin, East Germany
- Education: Ernst Busch Academy of Dramatic Arts
- Occupations: Actress, narrator
- Children: 1 daughter

Ulrike Krumbiegel (born 16 December 1961) is a German actress. She has performed in more than 100 film and TV productions. In her early career, she performed in East German cinema and theatre. After the re-unification of Germany, her career continued with appearances in crime series such as Tatort, and the ZDF series SOKO München. She has also continued to appear in the theatre, featuring in plays by Berthold Brecht, Henrik Ibsen and William Shakespeare.

== Life ==
=== Origin and training ===
Ulrike Krumbiegel was born in East Berlin, East Germany, as one of two daughters of an international trader and a nurse. She grew up in Mitte. In 1976, she heard on the DDR-Radio that they are looking for an actor. At 15 years old, she applied as a student to the amateur playing group of the Berliner Volksbühne, where she was accepted and starred in Die Nacht nach der Abschlussfeier by Soviet writer Vladimir Tendryakov.

After her school training (Abitur 1980 in Mitte), she completed her acting studies at the Ernst Busch Academy of Dramatic Arts in Berlin until 1983.

=== Theatre ===
She got her first stage engagement at the Mecklenburg State Theatre, where she was on stage as Iphigenie and Minna von Barnhelm, among others. In 1986, she moved to the Deutsches Theater, where she was a longtime member for 15 years altogether until 2001 and worked with directors like Frank Castorf, Jürgen Gosch, and many times with Thomas Langhoff. Krumbiegel played many roles in the classical theatre repertoires. In the 1989–90 season, she starred as Natascha in Nachtasyl (Director: Friedo Solter). In the 1990–91 season, she was the Eve in The Broken Jug. In the 1991–92 season, she took over the title role in a new production of the Kleist play Das Käthchen von Heilbronn.

Further stations were the Berliner Ensemble, the Munich Kammerspiele, the Maxim Gorki Theatre, and the Residenz Theatre of the Bayerisches Staatsschauspiel. At the Maxim Gorki Theatre, she again starred in the 2001–02 season in Goethe's Iphigenie, in a production by Thomas Langhoff, with Klaus Manchen (Thoas), Joachim Meyerhoff (Orest), Tilo Nest (Pylades), and Siegfried Terpoorten (Arkas) as partners. In the 2003–04 season at the Munich Residenztheater (staged by Thomas Langhoff), she was the whore Yvette in the Brecht play Mother Courage and Her Children, her lager whore was a "broken, tragicomic number between brokenness, lust, love and business ability". In the 2003–04 season, she starred along with the Berliner Ensemble as Gina Ekdal in the Henrik Ibsen play The Wild Duck (Director: Thomas Langhoff). In 2005, she starred in Munich Kammerspielen as Queen Gertrude in Hamlet (Director: Lars-Ole Walburg).

=== East German film and TV ===
In the late phase of East Germany, Krumbiegel worked in many TV films and DEFA productions. The director Bodo Fürneisen discovered her while in her studies and gave her a female lead role in the 1981 TV film Komm mit mir nach Chicago; Krumbiegel played the role of 17-year-old waiter apprentice Anja, who "goes from an ugly duckling to a beautiful swan". More film and TV tasks for DEFA and the Deutscher Fernsehfunk followed.

In the youth film Schwierig sich zu verloben (1982–83) by Karl-Heinz Heymann, she took the role of the young saleswoman Barbara, whose love for the locksmith Wolle (Werner Tritzschler) breaks down when she tells him of her pregnancy. In the DEFA film Junge Leute in der Stadt (1984–85), Ulrike Krumbiegel, under the directing of Karl-Heinz Lotz, the saleswoman Frieda, who, in order to not lose her place, had to be sexually blackmailed by her boss Richard.

=== After the Peaceful Revolution ===
After East Germany ended, she kept getting roles in demanding cinema and TV productions, such as Dietmar Klein's 1992 comedy Der Erdnussmann or Im Namen der Unschuld. She also worked together with directors Margarethe von Trotta and Andreas Kleinert. From 2000, Krumbiegel accepted more film and TV deals, but continued to appear, albeit to a reduced extent, in selected productions. In the meantime, Krumbiegel has participated in more than 100 film and television productions.

In the drama film Heidi M. (2001) by Michael Klier she played, alongside Katrin Sass, her girlfriend. In the 2004 war film Downfall, she played the fictional role of Dorothee Kranz, who was the mother of Hitler Youth soldier Peter Kranz. In the 2005 thriller Antibodies by Christian Alvart, she played Rosa Martens, the wife of a village policeman who witnessed her husband being manipulated by a jailed serial killer. In the 2007 teen film Meer is nich, she was the mother Karla, whose 17-year-old daughter is in a deep phase of self-discovery and indecision shortly before graduating from high school.

=== Crime series work ===
She starred many times in the crime series Tatort.

In the Swedish thriller series Greyzone (2018), she took a supporting role as German weapons designer Renate Gleisner. While shooting, Krumbiegel said her lines in English with a German accent. In the ZDF series The Old Fox, she took the role of Chairwoman Judge Emma Horvath, who is grieving for her child, one of the leading episodes in the new season, which will air from April 2019. In the ZDF series SOKO München (2020), she played, alongside Nils Hohenhövel, the mother of a suspect who becomes a murderer.

=== Private ===
Krumbiegel is the mother of a grown-up daughter, whom she raised alone. Her hobbies are skiing and sailing and she lives in Mitte.

== Role profile and awards ==
Ulrike Krumbiegel is deemed as one of the most convincing character actresses in Germany. Determined on any particular type, she played little girls several times at the beginning of her career; later, she was often the silent woman in the background. She was often naïve or needy, proving her flexibility at many times. Her roles are characterised by a "wide range". In critics, her "physical weakness", her "sense", and the "brittleness" were emphasized in her presentation.

For her performance in the TV film Geschlecht: weiblich by Dirk Kummer, she earned in 2003 the German TV Awards in the category "Best Actress – Lead Role". In 2008, Krumbiegel won the Golden Camera as best actress. She was honoured for her role in Polizeiruf 110: Jenseits. She was shortlisted for the 2009 German Film Award in the category "Best Performance - Female Supporting Role" for A Woman in Berlin. For the 2010 German Television Award she was nominated for "Best Actress" for her role in The Lost Father.

== Selected filmography ==
- 1982: Komm mit mir nach Chicago (TV Movie) - Anja Paul
- 1983: Schwierig sich zu verloben - Brigitta
- 1983: Der Staatsanwalt hat das Wort: Ein gefährlicher Fund (TV Series) - Heike Baum
- 1984: Iphigenie in Aulis (Theatre recording)
- 1984-2017: Polizeiruf 110 (TV Series) - Heidi Schoppe / Nina Hausner / Katja Kraatz / Beatrice / Frau Kerner / Angelika Sladowski
- 1985: Junge Leute in der Stadt - Frieda
- 1986: Jungfer Miras Mirakel (TV Movie) - Suschen Falk
- 1986: Der Hut des Brigadiers - Heide Reider
- 1988: Fallada – The Last Chapter - Anneliese
- 1988: Felix and the Wolf - Mutter Grosser
- 1988: Der Aufstand der Fischer von St. Barbara (TV Movie) - Marie
- 1989: The Break - Tina
- 1990: Sehnsucht - Ena
- 1990: Heute sterben immer nur die anderen - Lisa
- 1991: Der Verdacht - Irina, Karins Schwester
- 1991: Schlaflose Tage (TV Movie) - Antonia
- 1992: Der Erdnußmann - Linda
- 1992: Miraculi
- 1992: Ärzte (TV Series) - Eva Schindler
- 1995: The Promise - Elisabeth
- 1995: Der Kontrolleur - Marianne / Inge
- 1996-2021: Tatort (TV Series) - Bettina Mai / Angelika Zerrer / Ina Armbaum / Bea Kubitz / Simone Mende / Krankenpflegerin Inge Kehrer / Sofie Reber / Carola Barneck / Simone Ahlert
- 1997: Im Namen der Unschuld - Sandra Wegmann
- 2001: Heidi M. - Lilo
- 2001: Paulas Schuld (TV Movie) - Paula
- 2001: Schimanski (TV Series) - Manuela Keller
- 2002: In einer Nacht wie dieser (TV Movie) - Yvonne Steininger
- 2002: Mein Vater (TV Movie) - Anja Esser
- 2003: Sternzeichen - Mutter von Alexander
- 2003: Geschlecht weiblich (TV Movie) - Dina Grossmann
- 2003–2013: Bloch (TV Series) - Clara Born
- 2004: Downfall - Dorothee Kranz
- 2004: Der Stich des Skorpion (TV Movie) - Maria Michaelis
- 2004: Das Schwalbennest (TV Movie) - Rita Stützler
- 2005: Mord am Meer (TV Movie) - Renate Siedler
- 2005: Antibodies - Rosa Martens
- 2005: Bella Block (TV Series) - Silke Voss
- 2006: Erased (TV Movie) - Dr. Katharina Trapp
- 2006: Väter – denn sie wissen nicht, was sich tut (TV Movie) - Marion Vollmer
- 2006: Das Duo (TV Series) - Susanne Walters
- 2007: Hounds - Brigitte
- 2007: Meer is nich - Karla - mother
- 2007: Solo für Schwarz (TV Movie) - Maren Brügge
- 2008: Nachtschicht (TV Series) - Violetta Kiesewetter
- 2008: Hurenkinder (TV Movie) - Isolde
- 2008: Die Weisheit der Wolken (TV Movie) - Katrin Paulsen
- 2008: A Woman in Berlin - Ilse Hoch
- 2008: Stolberg (TV Series) - Ida Sonnenburg
- 2009: Beyond the Wall (TV Movie) - Susanne Pramann
- 2009: Being Mr. Kotschie - Carmen Schöne
- 2010: The Lost Father (TV Movie) - Elke Hagestedt
- 2010: Auftrag in Afrika (TV Movie) - Simone Schumann
- 2010: Vater Morgana - Britta
- 2011: Stilles Tal - Barbara Stille
- 2012: Die Jagd nach dem weißen Gold (TV Movie) - Frau Schumann
- 2012-2017: Spreewaldkrimi (TV Series) - Marianne Stein
- 2013: Im Netz (TV Movie) - Kommissarin Theissen
- 2013: Danni Lowinski (TV Series) - Judith Ritter
- 2013: Grossstadtklein - Susanne
- 2013: Die goldene Gans (TV Movie) - Edeltraud
- 2013: Ein starkes Team (TV Series) - Katharina Dammers
- 2014: Der Kriminalist (TV Series) - Nike Cloppenburg
- 2014: Elly Beinhorn: Solo Flight (TV Movie) - Elly's Mother
- 2014: Alles Verbrecher – Eiskalte Liebe (TV Movie) - Herta Frohwitter
- 2014: Zu mir oder zu dir? (TV Movie) - Elke Landowski
- 2014: Sein gutes Recht (TV Movie) - Nicole Burkhardt
- 2015: Der Blindgänger (TV Movie) - Sanna Stein
- 2015: Alles Verbrecher – Leiche im Keller (TV Movie) - Kommissarin Herta Frohwitter
- 2015: Unter der Haut (TV Movie) - Marianne Siedler
- 2015-2019: The Old Fox (TV Series) - Emma Horvath / Veronika Berndorfer
- 2016: Mutter reicht's jetzt - Barbara Weller
- 2017: Matula (TV Movie) - Ann-Gret Dahus
- 2017: Happy Burnout - Dr. Gunst
- 2017: Stralsund (TV Series) - Anke Liebrecht
- 2017: Die Anfängerin - Dr. Annebärbel Buschhaus
- 2017: Back for Good
- 2017: In Wahrheit (TV Series) - Frau Schäffler
- 2017: Die Anfängerin - Dr. Annebärbel Buschhaus
- 2017-2021: Letzte Spur Berlin (TV Series) - Renate Elbe
- 2018: Greyzone (TV Series) - Renate Gleisner
- 2019: Inga Lindström (TV Series) - Nora
- 2019: Irgendwas bleibt immer (TV Movie) - Melanie Krömer
- 2020: SOKO München (TV Series) - Bernadette Müller
- 2020: Der Kroatien-Krimi (TV Series) - Danica
- 2021: Das Mädchen mit den goldenen Händen - Victoria

== Theatre ==
- 1986: Johann Wolfgang von Goethe: Egmont (Klärchen) – Director: Friedo Solter (Deutsches Theater Berlin)
- 1988: Michail Bulgakow: Paris, Paris (Schneiderin) – Director: Frank Castorf (Deutsches Theater Berlin)
- 1990: Heinrich von Kleist: Der zerbrochne Krug (Eve) – Director: Thomas Langhoff (Deutsches Theater Berlin)
- 1990: Maxim Gorki: Nachtasyl (Natascha) – Director: Friedo Solter (Deutsches Theater Berlin)
- 1991: Peter Turrini: Der Minderleister (Arbeiterin) – Director: Carl-Hermann Risse (Deutsches Theater Berlin)

== Audiobooks ==
- Simone Schneider: Die Schöne und das Tier : Hörspiel. Freiburg [u. a.], 1994, ISBN 3-451-31013-9.
- Monika Feth: Meine schrecklich liebe, kleine Schwester. Hamburg, 1998, ISBN 3-8291-0805-2.
- John Grisham: The Partner : Hörspiel. München, 2000, ISBN 3-453-18128-X.
- Kurt Tucholsky: Rheinsberg: Ein Bilderbuch für Verliebte Berlin, 2001, ISBN 3-89813-158-0.
- Damals in der DDR : Feature. eine vierteilige Hördokumentation nach der gleichnamigen TV series, eine Produktion von MDR Figaro in Koproduktion mit MDR. Köln, 2004.
- Kjell Eriksson: Das Steinbett : Kriminalhörspiel. Berlin, 2005, ISBN 3-89813-461-X.
- Johann Wolfgang von Goethe: Iphigenie in Tauris Argon Verlag GmbH 2007, ISBN 978-3-86610-181-4.
- Marina Lewycka: Kurze Geschichte des Traktors auf Ukrainisch : Hörspiel. München, 2007, ISBN 978-3-86717-077-2.
- Anna Seghers: Aufstand der Fischer von St. Barbara Berlin, 2008, ISBN 978-3-89813-755-3.
- Erin Hunter: Feuer und Eis. Weinheim, 2008, ISBN 978-3-407-81046-5.
- Erin Hunter: In die Wildnis. Weinheim, 2008, ISBN 978-3-407-81045-8.
- Hans Christian Andersen: The Little Mermaid. Köln, 2010, ISBN 3-89830-253-9.

== Radioplays ==
- 1985: Kurt Tucholsky: Rheinsberg (Claire) – Director: Barbara Plensat (Hörspiel – Rundfunk der DDR)
- 1985: Franz Fühmann: Das blaue Licht (Hexe) – Director: Barbara Plensat (Fantasy, Märchen für Erwachsene – Rundfunk der DDR)
- 1986: Walter Jens nach Euripides: Der Untergang (Kassandra) – Director: Barbara Plensat (Hörspiel nach der Tragödie: Die Troerinnen – Rundfunk der DDR)
- 1987: Georg Hirschfeld: Pauline (Lucie) – Director: Werner Grunow (Hörspiel – Rundfunk der DDR)
- 1988: Homer: Die Irrfahrten des Odysseus (Kalypso) – Director: Werner Buhss (Kinderhörspiel (6 Teile) – Rundfunk der DDR)
- 1989: Peter Brasch: Santerre (Jean) – Director: Joachim Staritz (Hörspiel – Rundfunk der DDR)
- 1991: Jacob Grimm/Wilhelm Grimm: Sex-Märchen zur Nacht (Königstochter) – Director: Barbara Plensat (Märchen für Erwachsene – Funkhaus Berlin)
- 1992: Reinhard Lakomy & Monika Ehrhardt: Der Wasserkristall (Quingel) – Director: Rainer Schwarz (Geschichtenlieder-Hörspiel – DSB)
- 1994: Michael Koser Ufos über Professor Van Dusen, Director: Sylvia Rauer und Rainer Clute (DKultur)
- 1995: Reinhard Lakomy & Monika Ehrhardt: Der Regenbogen (Quingel) – Director: Jürgen Thormann (Geschichtenlieder-Hörspiel – Sony Music)
- 1996: Waleri Petrow: Die Zauberperle (Telefon-Stimme) – Director: Werner Buhss (Kinderhörspiel – MDR/DLR)
- 1996: Franz Zauleck: Olga bleibt Olga – Director: Karlheinz Liefers (Kinderhörspiel – DLR Berlin)
- 1996: Karl Kirsch: Arthur – Director: Albrecht Surkau (Kriminalhörspiel – DLR)
- 1998: Peter F. Steinbach: Warum ist es am Rhein so schön... (Eva) – Director: Hans Gerd Krogmann (Hörspiel – WDR/DLR)
- 2003: Dylan Thomas: Unter dem Milchwald (Polly Garter) – Director: Götz Fritsch (Hörspiel – MDR)
- 2009: Carl Ceiss: Engel von Bremen – Director: Ulrich Lampen (Hörspiel – RB/SR)
- 2011: Marianne Zückler: Die Läuferin (Irene) – Director: Andrea Getto (Hörspiel – RBB/NDR)
- 2013: Ingrid Strobl: Old Man Prison Blues – Director: Thom Kubli (|WDR)
- 2014: Ingo Schulze: Das „Deutschlandgerät" – Director: Stefan Kanis (Hörspiel – MDR)
- 2016: Reinhard Lakomy & Monika Ehrhardt: Die Sonne (Quingel) – Director: Monika Ehrhardt (Geschichtenlieder-Hörspiel – Sony Music)
- 2018: Juli Zeh: Unterleuten – Director: Judith Lorentz (NDR/rbb)
