= Honey Love =

Honey Love may refer to:

- Honey Love (The Drifters song)
- Honey Love (R. Kelly and Public Announcement song)
- CoCo Brown, American pornographic actress who has used the alias Honey Love
