= Kubli =

Kubli is a surname. Notable people with the surname include:

- Angélica Argüelles Kubli (born 1963), Mexican graphic designer
- Kaspar K. Kubli (1869–1943), American politician
- Manuel Kubli (born 1995), Swiss footballer
- Pablo Kubli (born 1953), Mexican sculptor
- Thom Kubli (born 1969), Swiss-German composer and artist
