= Black Hole Horizon =

Kinetic sculpture

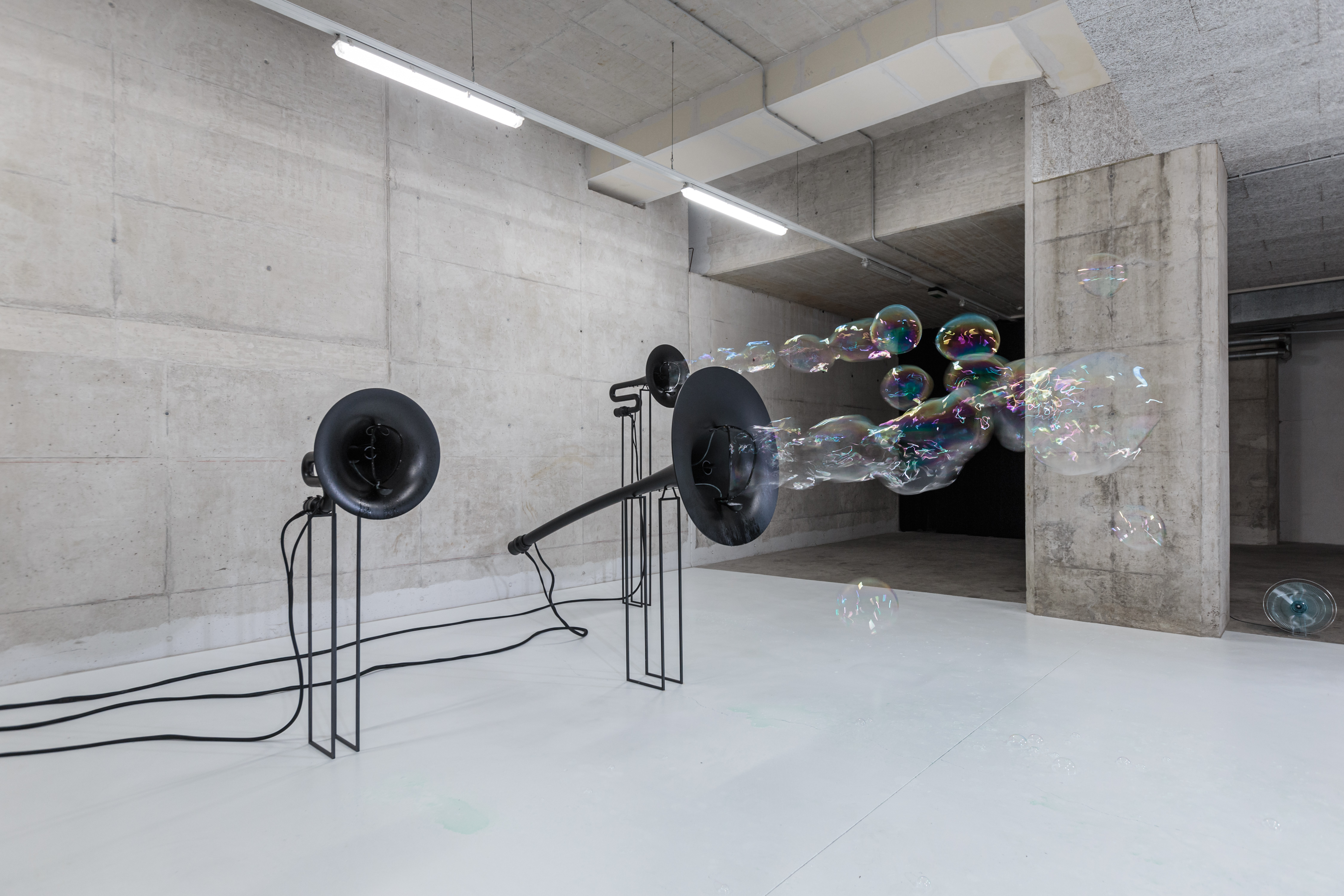
- Artist: Thom Kubli
- Type: Installation art

Black Hole Horizon is a kinetic sculpture created by Swiss-German artist Thom Kubli between the years 2012 and 2015.

== Description ==
The installation consists of three sculptures of different sizes made of polyurethane, which, similar to ship horns, emerge in exponential funnels. The objects are capable of generating sounds with the use of compressed air. With each tone, large soap bubbles appear on the objects' flare. They increase in size with the sound duration, eventually detach from the horn and float through the room until they burst at an unpredictable moment and location in the space. The sometimes man-sized soap bubbles can travel over twenty meters, depending on the thermal condition. Visitors freely move on runways through the room and encounter the floating objects.

As the bubbles get formed by the air stream coming from the horn's tube, it suggests to the viewer that the sound becomes transformed into the floating object and somehow is "stored" in it at the moment when it detaches from the horn. This notion is intensified as the sound's waveform becomes visible in the movement of the forming soap bubble.

In line with Kubli's interest in working with composition software, he created an algorithm that utilizes probability and chance operations to control the three sculptures. It focuses on the interplay between the sound and the choreography of the soap bubbles in the room. There is a constant renewal of the spatial situation through the soap bubbles' volatility and their unpredictable movements.

The title Black Hole Horizon refers to the astrophysical phenomenon of the event horizon; a boundary in spacetime beyond which events are no longer perceptible to the human observer.

== Background ==
"It was important to me for the sound to have a material correspondence, not a virtual one. This type of transformation touched me in a very special way. It created a very direct aesthetic connection." – Thom Kubli

Kubli designed the first version of Black Hole horizon in 2011. He researched the idea of transforming sound into tangible objects, in particular, into free-floating autonomous bodies that occupy and constantly transform physical space. As in earlier works, he explored the potential of transitional processes and their effects on the viewer's perception. It led to developing an environment that encourages playful and explorative social dynamics through the interaction of the audience with the work.

With the creation of the horn sculptures, Kubli reflected on developments in contemporary art such as Anish Kapoor's monumental sculpture of Marsyas and Terry Adkin's work Last Trumpet. He also found inspiration in the historical noise generators Intonarumori by the futuristic painter and composer Luigi Russolo and in the natural trumpets Dungchen, which are played on Tibetan ceremonials.

As part of a collaboration with the Architecture Department of the Rensselaer Polytechnic Institute and EMPAC, Troy, New York, a first version of the work was realized in summer 2012. Kubli worked closely with astrophysicist Zackery Balanger and mechatronics engineer David Jaschik to address the significant engineering, thermal, and physical challenges.

== Public perception ==
From August 20 to September 1, 2012, Kubli presented the first functional version of Black Hole Horizon at EMPAC's Studio2 in Troy, New York. It was a single hanging horn sculpture. After a further technical development phase, all three sculptures were shown as an active installation for the first time from February 20 to April 5, 2015, at the Kunstverein Ingolstadt.

In 2016, the Ars Electronica Festival presented Black Hole Horizon in its annual thematic exhibition. The organizers described the installation as an "absolute crowd-puller". This presentation made Black Hole Horizon known to a broad international audience for the first time. The encounter between Kubli and Hiroshi Ishii, who led the symposium there, resulted in a long-term cooperation with the Tangible Media Group at the MIT Media Lab, Boston.

From July 17 to December 3, 2017, Black Hole Horizon was shown in São Paulo as part of the FILE Festival. The theme of the event was Bubbling Universes, based on the quantum physical multiverse theory. Black Hole Horizon was installed as the festival's central work in the foyer of the FIESP building on Avenida Paulista. As the largest festival for new media art in Latin America, the exhibition attracted over 72,000 visitors.

Because of its strong visual quality and general accessibility for the public regardless of age and cultural background, the work was received predominantly positively by art critics and curators.

The art critic Dominique Moulon noted: "The spectacle of these autonomous bubbles represents a range of frequencies of variable duration and relative strangeness, that all brings us back to our childhood. Evanescent, these audio-visual entities punctuate the performance of their programmed disappearance."

The art and media scientist Marcel René Marburger wrote: "Starting with the probability-based electronic impulses, we are dealing with a chain of coincidences in which we are all representing the last link. With each chance factor, the work will become even more unlikely, and thus even more innovative."

== Construction ==
Each of the horn objects is constructed like a wind instrument. A membrane chamber is excited through compressed air, which generates the sound. The resulting airflow hits a soap bubble membrane, forms the soap bubble and eventually extrudes it. A liquid circuit supplies the digitally controlled mechanics with the required amount of soap bubble solution. The three horn objects are tuned differently, each holding a static frequency that is defined by the length of the sound-amplifying tubing. The shape of the horn objects was developed using a series of digital simulations.
