= Rezza (disambiguation) =

Rezza may refer to:

- Rezza, a commune in the Corse-du-Sud department of France on the island of Corsica
- Rezza Rezky (born 2000), a Singaporean professional footballer
- Sheikh Rezza Talabani, a celebrated Kurdish poet from Kirkuk, Iraq
- Sol Rezza (born 1982), a composer, audio engineer and radio producer
