= Antibodies (film) =

2005 film by Christian Alvart

- Theatrical release poster
- German: Antikörper
- Directed by: Christian Alvart
- Written by: Christian Alvart
- Produced by: Theo Baltz; Boris Schönfelder
- Starring: Wotan Wilke Möhring; André Hennicke; Heinz Hoenig; Ulrike Krumbiegel; Nina Proll; Jürgen Schornagel; Konstantin Graudus; Klaus Zmorek; Hauke Diekamp
- Cinematography: Hagen Bogdanski
- Edited by: Philipp Stahl
- Music by: Michl Britsch
- Production companies: Medienkontor Movie GmbH; Kinowelt Filmroduktion GmbH
- Distributed by: Kinowelt Filmverleih
- Release dates: 24 April 2005 (Tribeca); 7 July 2005 (Germany)
- Running time: 127 minutes
- Country: Germany
- Language: German

Antibodies (German: Antikörper) is a 2005 German crime thriller film written and directed by Christian Alvart, and starring Wotan Wilke Möhring, André Hennicke and Heinz Hoenig. It was released in Germany on 7 July 2005.

== Plot ==
In Berlin, the pederast serial killer Gabriel Engel, who later admitted to brutally killing 13 boys and painted impressive religious works of art with their blood, is accidentally taken during an overnight operation. Commissioner Seiler is charged with the interrogation of the murderer.

In the small village of Herzbach, memories of the unsolved murder of 12-year-old Lucia are still alive and the crime is attributed to Engel. Michael Martens, a police officer from Herzbach, decides to travel to Berlin to talk with Engel. During the case, he neglected his wife and children.

In Berlin, it is assumed that there are parallels between the murders. The Berlin police are no longer able to get information from Engel. Martens tries his luck, and manages to persuade Engel to talk. However, Engel is playing a game with Martens during which reality and fiction blend more and more. Martens is soon convinced that the murderer of the girl is still at large.

Martens, a devout Catholic, slowly begins to explore his dark side and begins a brief affair with a woman from the city.

After Engel has ingested poison which he acquired through bribery, he has 48 hours to live. Finally, Engel tells Martens the story of the murder of Lucy, which he claims to have not committed, but only observed. He tries to throw suspicion on Martens' difficult 13-year-old son.

The desperate Martens then decides to kill his son, but in the meantime, Commissioner Seiler finds out that Engel has committed suicide and that Martens has been tricked by Engel as a means to kill beyond the grave. Luckily, Seiler is able to find Marten before he goes through with it and saves him and his son.

== Cast ==
- Wotan Wilke Möhring as Michael Martens
- André Hennicke as Gabriel Engel
- Heinz Hoenig as Seiler
- Nina Proll as Lucy
- Konstantin Graudus as Wosniak
- Ulrike Krumbiegel as Rosa Martens
- Hauke Diekamp as Christian Martens
- Norman Reedus as Officer Schmitz
- Christian von Aster as Officer Wagner
- Jürgen Schornagel as Sucharzewski
- Gudrun Ritter as Frau Sucharzewski
- Laura Alberta Szalski as Sarah Martens
- Klaus Zmorek as Bosowski
- Domenico D'Ambrosio as Technician
- Holger Franke as Karl Prebisch
- Jockel Tschiersch as Gabhart
- Hans Diehl as Priest
- Bruno Grass as Frank Flieder
- Natascha Paulick as Maria Flieder
- Frank Kusche as Wärter Schmidtzen
- Elisa Schrey as Anna (Crying Girl)
- Edie Samland as Esther Gabhart
- Stefanie Fuchs as Moni
- Isabel Bongard as Lucia Flieder
- Marie Lindner as Tamara Gabhart
- Dietmar Horst Hedram as Junkie
- Laila Mohmand as prostitute
- Martin Umbach as psychiatrist
- Holger Reibiger as Wärter
- Nadeshda Brennicke as Nightclub Singer
- Coco Brown as Michelle
- Lydia Kavungu as Joy
- Rainer Laupichler as Kneiff
- Milton Welsh as Fricke
- Leonardo Nigro as Schnorres
- Maria Schuster as Meiser
- Thomas Klees as Verlagsmanager
