= Sol Rezza =

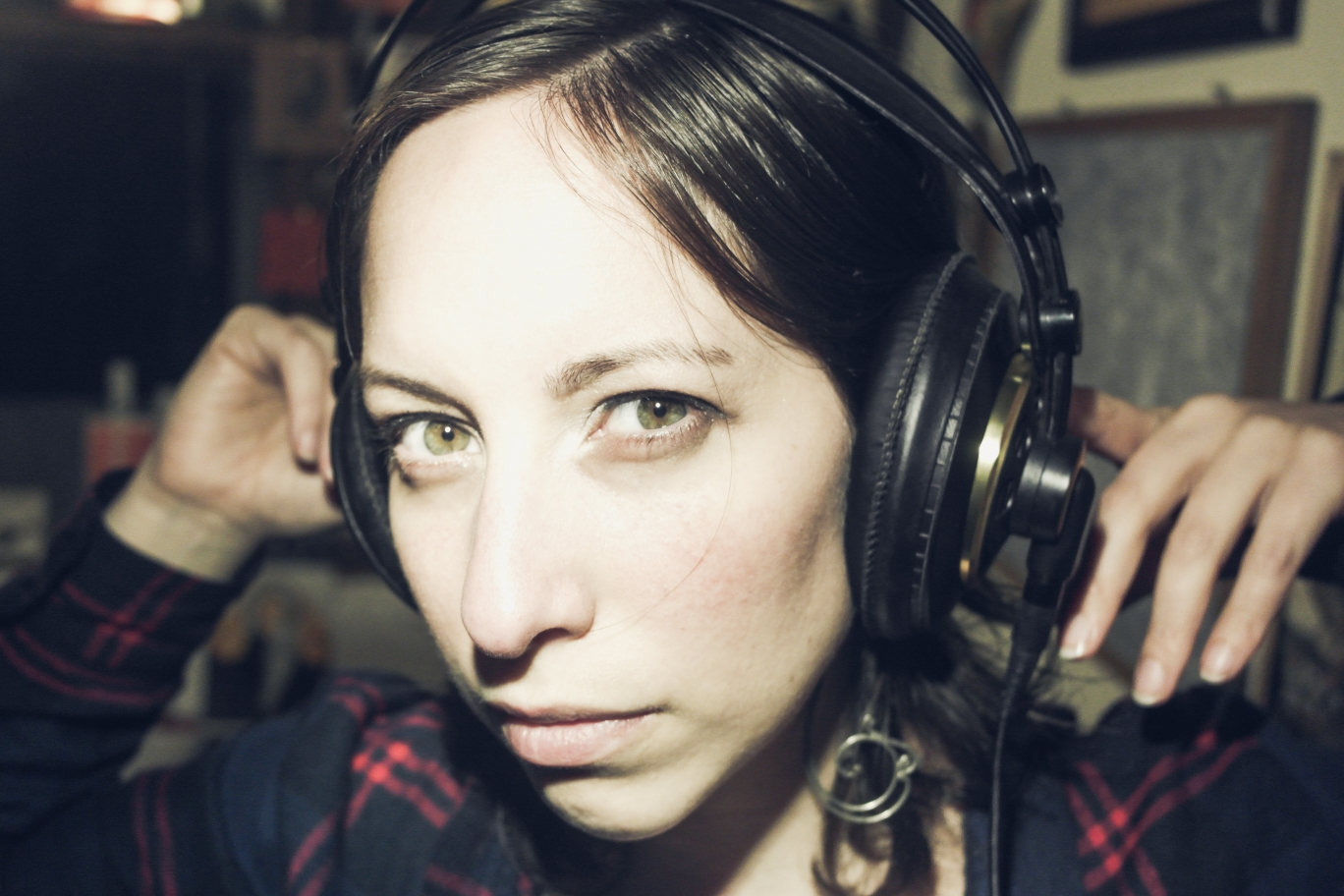
- Sol Rezza by Daniel Iván

Background information
- Born: April 7, 1982 (age 43)
- Origin: Buenos Aires, Argentina
- Genres: experimental, Noise, Minimal, Electronic music, Electroacoustic music, Ambient, Radio Art
- Occupation(s): composer, radio producer, musician, sound designer
- Instrument(s): Computer, piano, virtual Instruments
- Years active: 2008–present
- Website: solrezza.net

Sol Rezza (born April 7, 1982, Buenos Aires, Argentina) is an Argentine composer and sound designer who specializes in fusing experimental electronics with immersive audio. Her compositions integrate multilingual voice samples, granular synthesis and sequencers with open-source multichannel audio technology, such as the SoundSquares plug-in.

== Early career ==
In 2006–2007, she traveled through Chile, Bolivia, Peru, Ecuador, Colombia and Mexico with the itinerant radio project Estudio Rodante.

In 2009, she studied audio engineering and sound design and began to experiment with microphones and other sound devices. After moving to Mexico, she began her work on experimental compositions and radio art. During this period, she collaborated with various community radio stations on the experimental program titled El silencio NO existe.

== Career ==
Rezza wrote articles about sound experimentation, soundscape and deep listening to the magazine Sonograma, Sul Ponticello, among other publications.

In 2009, Rezza composed an album titled Ex nihilo nihil fit based on texts by Oliverio Girondo. Although the album is not officially released it participated at Prix Bohemia Radio 2010 and the Electronic Language International Festival.

In 2015 the sound work "25 segundos de vida" belonging to the album Ex nihilo nihil fit was selected to participate in the first exhibition of sound art in Argentina.

From 2010 to 2012, Rezza performed with the Mexican multimedia artist Daniel Ivan in the first of a series of live performances titled Matar al Gato, a multimedia art and sound art event.

Rezza's second album Verdades Minúsculas 2010 was selected by Festival Netaudio London 2011 and the Soundwaves Festival in Brighton, UK. In the same year, 2010, her radio piece "El año del conejo", inspired by the text El Pensamiento náhuatl cifrado en los calendarios by Laurette Séjourné, was part of Journée Internationale de la Création Radiophonique and the Radio Arts Space's international sound art and radio art exhibition.

In 2011, through the label Acustronica, Rezza's experimental music, noise and soundscape work titled "SPIT" was released, receiving favorable reviews in ATTN Magazine and Music on TNT. It was selected by artist Steve Heimbecker in the first series of concerts in 64-channel multi-channel surround sound system in 2011 and the track "The Cat" was broadcast on Late Junction BBC Radio 3. In the same year she released "The existence of the light" to be published solely on Tumblr.

In 2013 she released "32 Turbulencias" and in 2014 her experimental work "Ntangu" was played at the Sonophilia Festival. Before the end of 2014 she published "La simplicité d’une goutte", which was broadcast in the special radio show of Women's Day on KFAI Radio. In December 2014 the radio program Dr. Klangendum Concertzender Radio broadcast two special feature programs about Sol Rezza discography.

=== 2015 ===
In 2015 her work titled "In The Darkness of the World" was commissioned to be premiered as a broadcast and as a performance by the CTM Festival 2015 for Adventurous Music and Art 2015 in the Radio Lab call, co-commissioned by Deutschlandradio Kultur. The Wire's Frances Morgan commented on Rezza's project:

The project is imaginative and playful, drawing on classic radiophonic drama, and its spatial aspect should make the installation inviting and accessible.

"In The Darkness Of The World" received favorable reviews in The Crack magazine, Gonzo, Mondo Magazin and M/Magazyn, and became part of the collection Sonosphere at Deutschlandradio Kultur.

In 2015 Rezza participated as advisory board in the New York Festivals International Radio Program Awards. Since 2015 she has collaborated with the Spanish music magazine Sul Ponticello.

=== 2018 ===
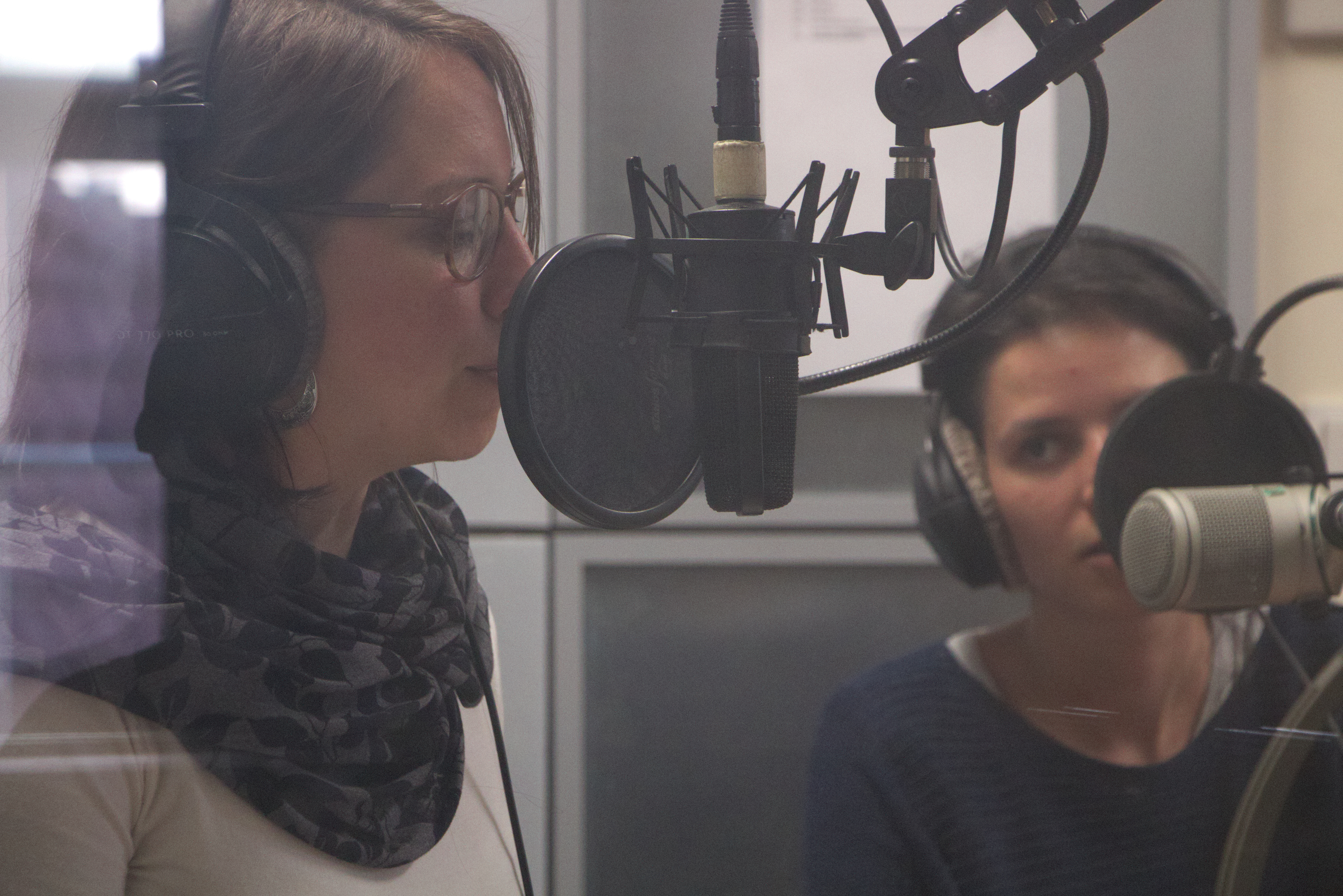

She was called by the German community radio station Radio Corax to be the first artist in residence specializing in radio art. She worked with the Radio Corax team to develop a sound map, "Sound Mapping Halle", with various pieces of experimental radio, and produced the live performance entitled "Opening", based on an interview with physicist Julian Barbour.

=== 2019 ===
Rezza participated in the RadioPhonic Places festival during the 100th anniversary of the Bauhaus University of Weimar with "Rooms in your Mind".

At the end of 2019 she presents her work, "Pool", commissioned by the Tsonami Festival.

== Radio art ==
- Sound Mapping Halle Radio Art residency 2018
- El piso mortal 2017
- El agujero negro 2017.
- "Cartas a mi misma 2016.
- Ritual Radio 2016.
- In the darkness of the world. 2015. Deutschlandradio Kultur
- KM/TB. 2014.
- Shorts for Radio.2012.(Album)
- Verdades Minúsculas. 2011. Netaudio Festival 2011 - Roundhouse.(Album)
- El año del conejo. 2010. Festival Blink 2011.(Album)
- Ex nihilo nihil fit. 2009.(Album)
- Bird Migration. 2009. Electronic Language International Festival 2010.

== Experimental music ==
- Pool. Festival Tsonami 2019
- Rooms in your mind 2018
- Storm/S. 2015–2016.
- La simplicité d’une goutte. 2014.
- Ntangu. 2014.
- 32 Turbulencias. 2013.(Album)
- The existence of the light | La Existencia de la Luz. 2011.(Album)
- SPIT. 2011.(Album)

== Performance ==
- Inundare 2021
- Temazcal 2019 - 2020
- Infinite Train. Proyecto Tanque 2019
- Opening. Radio Art Residency 2018.
- In the darkness of the world. CTM Festival 2015.
- Matar al gato 2.2: Ekpirótica. Collaboration with Daniel Iván Laboratorio Arte Alameda 2012.
- Matar al gato 2.0: Ekpirótica. Collaboration with Daniel Iván. 2011
- Matar al Gato 1: Conocimiento Funk. Collaboration with Daniel Iván. Ex Teresa Arte Actual 2010.

== Radio productions ==
- Ritual Radio 2016
- El silencio NO Existe 2009 - 2010 (radio series about experimental radio for community radio XHECA-FM).
- Una chica hablando de sonido 2013-2014 (podcast radio series about audio engineering and music)
