= Constitution of Brandenburg =

The constitution of the state of Brandenburg was adopted as a draft by the state parliament on April 14, 1992, and approved by the population in a referendum on June 14 with 94.04% of the valid votes. Since then, it has been amended seven times, most recently on May 16, 2019.

== Basic law ==
The state constitution was the first full constitution of a German state since 1949. New for a German constitution were above all the inclusion of basic social rights, the recognition of permanent partnerships in addition to marriage, an expanded principle of equality: everyone owes everyone the recognition of their dignity (Article 7 II), the obligation of radio and television to internal pluralism, an extensive catalogue for the protection of the environment (Article 39) and precise regulations for a total revision by a constitutional assembly (Article 116). The abolition of the Office for the Protection of the Constitution contained in the first draft was deleted after intervention by the State Chancellery. The constitution was drawn up by a specially appointed constitutional committee of thirty members, half of whom were members of the state parliament and the other half were external figures appointed by the parliamentary groups.

The constitution is based on

- the draft constitution of the Central Round Table in the GDR after the fall of the Wall,
- the catalogue of fundamental rights of the Basic Law and
- the draft constitution of the board of trustees for a democratically constituted Federation of German states from 1991.

It is strongly influenced by the freedom impetus of the civil movements from the time of the fall of the Berlin Wall: “Democracy Now”, “Initiative for Peace and Human Rights”, “New Forum”.

Further:

- to Germany's democratic constitutional tradition
- to the democratic traditions of Prussia
- to the Constitution of Brandenburg of 6 February 1947 (in force until 1952)

== Miscellaneous ==
On 22 November 2013, the Brandenburg State Parliament included an anti-racism clause in Article 7a of the Constitution, which reads as follows:

The country protects the peaceful coexistence of people and counteracts the spread of racist and xenophobic ideas.

— Verfassung des Landes Brandenburg – Art. 7a

In addition, Article 12(2) was supplemented with the addition ‘[No one shall] be favoured or disadvantaged on racial grounds’.

== Literature ==
- Brandenburgische Landeszentrale für politische Bildung: Die Brandenburger Verfassung. Entstehungsgeschichte, Besonderheiten, Verfassungstext, Potsdam 2017
- Christiane Büchner, Jochen Franzke: Das Land Brandenburg. Kleine politische Landeskunde. 5. Auflage. Brandenburgische Landeszentrale für politische Bildung, Potsdam 2010, ISBN 3-932502-09-4.
- Helmut Simon, Dietrich Franke, Michael Sachs: Handbuch der Verfassung des Landes Brandenburg. Boorberg, Stuttgart [u. a.] 1994, ISBN 3-415-01993-4.
- Hasso Lieber, Steffen Iwers, Martina Ernst: Verfassung des Landes Brandenburg. Kommentar. Kommunal- und Schulverlag, Wiesbaden. Loseblatt, Stand Juni 2017. ISBN 978-3-8293-0654-6

== See also ==
- Constitutional Court of Brandenburg
