= Hanna Lakomy =

German sex worker, activist and author

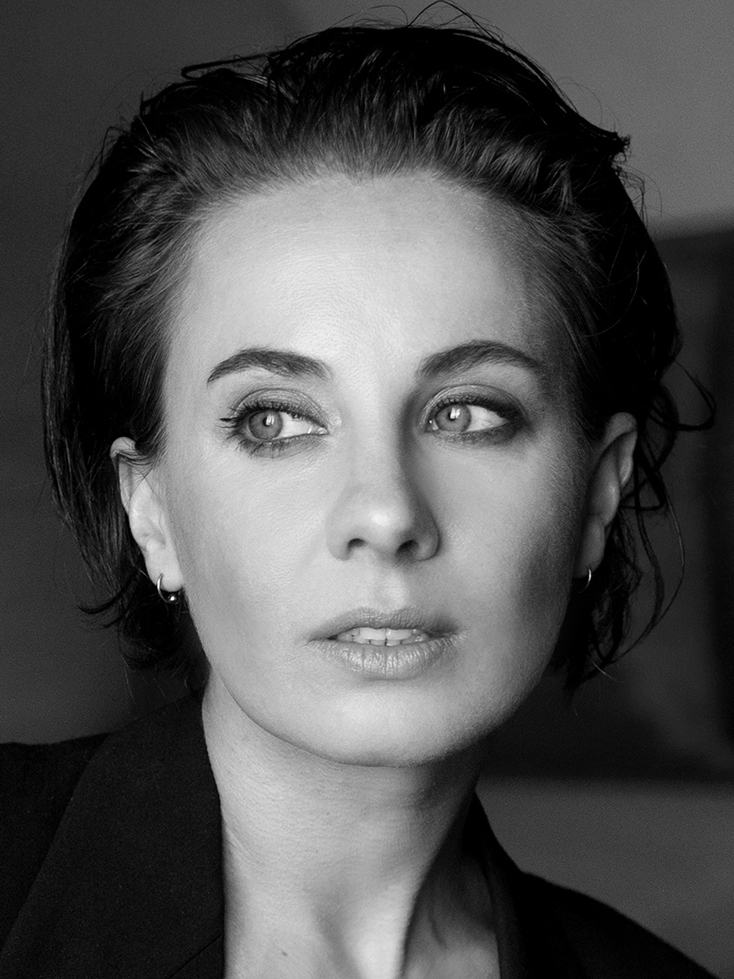
- Lakomy in 2022
- Born: February 28, 1984 (age 41); Pankow, East Berlin, East Germany
- Other names: Klara Lakomy; Salomé Balthus
- Occupation(s): prostitute, entrepreneur, columnist, writer
- Parent(s): Reinhard Lakomy, Monika Ehrhardt

Klara Johanna "Hanna" Lakomy (born 28 February 1984, East Berlin), also known as Salomé Balthus, is a German prostitute, entrepreneur, columnist and writer.

== Biography ==
Lakomy was born in Berlin-Pankow and grew up in Berlin as the daughter of the musician Reinhard Lakomy and poet Monika Ehrhardt. With them she participated as a speaker in the children's music album Der Wasserkristall (1992). In 2001 Lakomy took part in the workshop for young authors of the New Society for Literature. In 2003 she began studying philosophy and older German literature at the Humboldt University, where she obtained a master's degree in 2012. During her studies she published texts under Klara Lakomy in the magazines Edit and Utopie kreativ, worked as a nude model and from 2010 as a prostitute under the pseudonym Salomé Balthus.

In 2016, Lakomy founded the escort service Hetaera Berlin, a self-described 'feminist collective' of 'modern hetaeras', of which she is the managing director.

From August 2018 to April 2019, she wrote the online column Das Kanarienvögelchen for Die Welt, also under her pseudonym Salomé Balthus, about sociopolitical issues from the perspective of a prostitute. From March to June 2020, she was one of the diary writers for the Coronatagebuch column of the SZ-Magazin. Since November 2020, she has been writing the column Nachtgesichter in the Berliner Zeitung as Hanna Lakomy and the portrait series Berlin.Exotherm since March 2021.

She was described as 'Germany's most famous sex worker' in the Süddeutsche Zeitung in February 2020 and as 'Germany's most famous prostitute' by tip Berlin in April 2020.

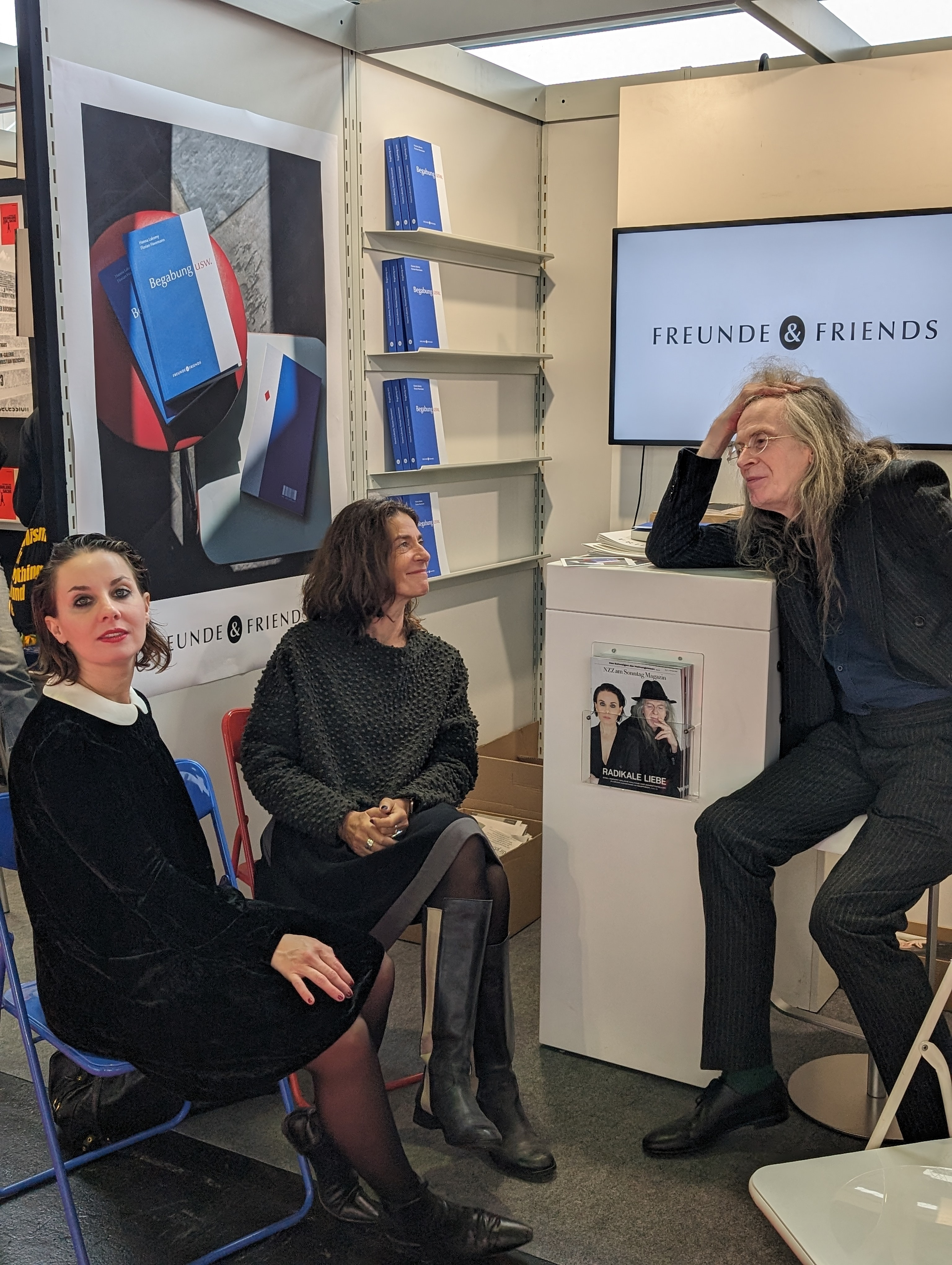
Lakomy and Florian Havemann at the Frankfurt Book Fair 2023

Lakomy lives in Berlin-Neukölln and is in a relationship with the writer Florian Havemann, with whom she wrote the novel Begabung usw in 2023.

== Controversies ==
On April 8, 2019, she appeared as Salomé Balthus on the Swiss talk show Schawinski, the result of which had consequences for both Lakomy and the presenter Roger Schawinski. She was asked questions on the show about her childhood with her famous father. A clip of Alice Schwarzer was shown in which she stated that the majority of voluntary prostitutes had been sexually abused as children. Schawinski then asked Lakomy whether she had also been sexually abused as a child. Lakomy misrepresented Schawinski's question in her next column in the Welt as 'Did your father sexually abuse you?' Schawinski described the quote as 'a serious defamation of my person and my integrity as a journalist'. Welt editor-in-chief Ulf Poschardt then ended Lakomy's column and apologized to Schawinski, which led to a public controversy in German and Swiss media, also in the context of the #MeToo movement. According to Lakomy, Don Alphonso announced that she would continue her work for the Welt as co-author of his blog column Stützen der Gesellschaft (Supporting Society).

In December 2019, Lakomy announced that she would file a lawsuit against the publisher and editor-in-chief of the Swiss Die Weltwoche, Roger Köppel, for violation of personal rights. The journalist Roman Zeller had booked an escort date with her at the end of 2019 and published a portrait of her in the Weltwoche on the basis of this. According to Lakomy, the publication was against her will and contained numerous unauthorized quotations. By mid-February 2020, she had raised 15,000 Swiss francs for the legal costs through crowdfunding. After a settlement negotiation failed on February 20, 2020, she filed a lawsuit against the Weltwoche which is ongoing.
