= Constitutional Court of Brandenburg =

German state constitutional court

Coordinates: 52.404917°N 13.055444°E

- Verfassungsgericht des Landes Brandenburg
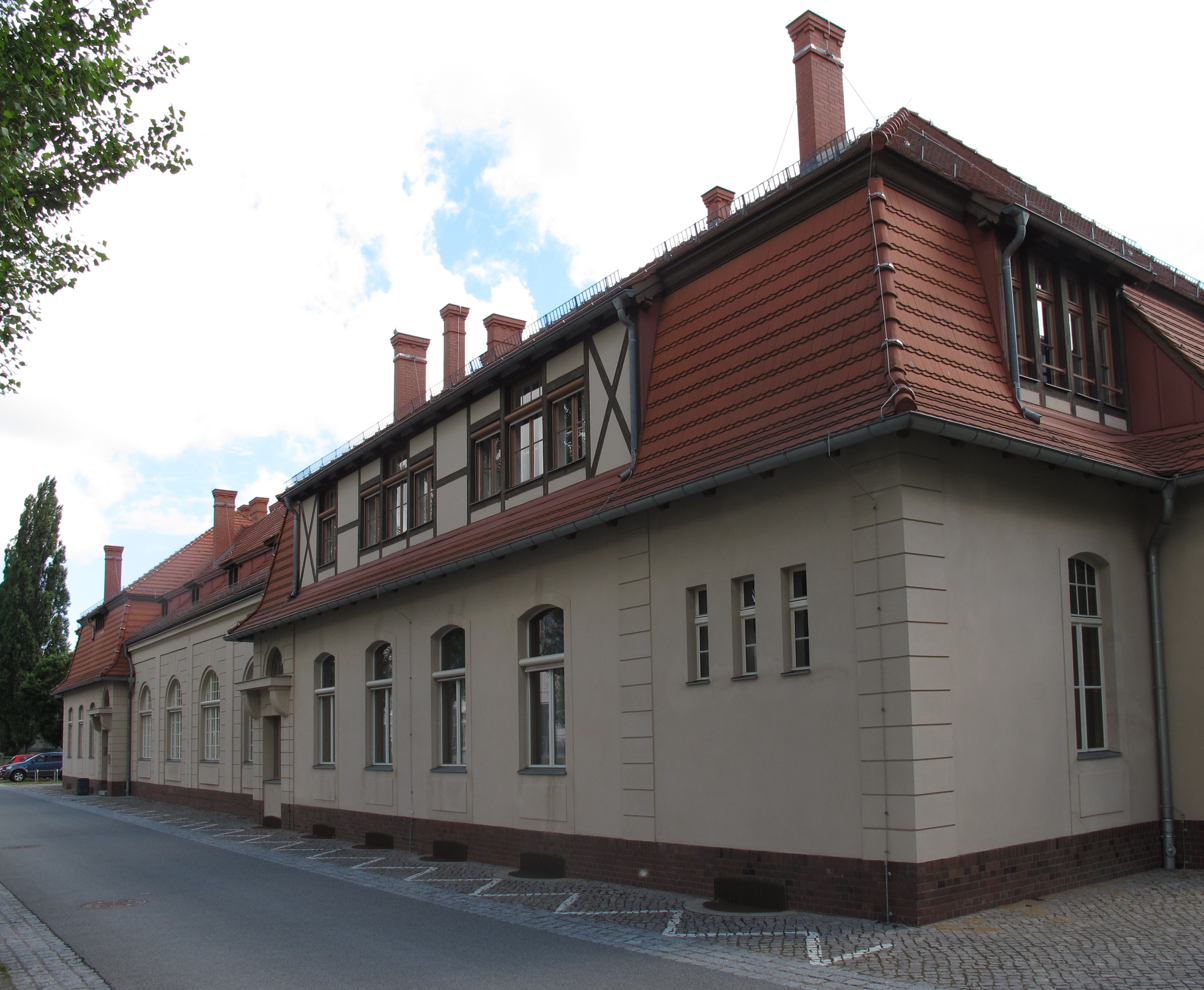
- Interactive map of Constitutional Court of Brandenburg
- Established: 1993
- Language: de
- Website: https://verfassungsgericht.brandenburg.de

President
- Currently: Markus Möller

The Constitutional Court of Brandenburg (German: Verfassungsgericht des Landes Brandenburg) is the third constitutional body of the State of Brandenburg, alongside the Landtag of Brandenburg and the Brandenburg State Government. As a constitutional court, it is responsible for deciding constitutional disputes.

== History ==
The Constitutional Court was the last of Brandenburg's constitutional bodies to begin its work in 1993.

Monika Weisberg-Schwarz was the first woman to head the court as president from 2004 to the end of 2008.

== Seat and composition of the court ==
=== Seat ===
The court is located in Potsdam. Its address is Jägerallee 9–12, 14469 Potsdam.

=== Composition ===
Article 112 of the Constitution of the State of Brandenburg regulates the composition and term of office of the members of the Constitutional Court. The Constitutional Court consists of the President, the Vice President and seven other judges. It is made up of one third professional judges, one third members with the qualifications to hold judicial office or with a legal degree, and one third members who do not have to meet these requirements. Members of the Constitutional Court can thus be non-lawyers. This has already been the case in the past, for example in the person of the writer, painter and composer Florian Havemann.

Article 112 of the Constitution of the State of Brandenburg allows the number of members of the Constitutional Court to be increased to twelve by law. The members of the Constitutional Court must be elected by the Landtag of Brandenburg with a majority of two-thirds of the members of the parliament. Their term of office is ten years without the possibility of re-election. In addition, only those who are at least thirty-five years old and eligible for election to the German Bundestag can be elected as constitutional judges. The members of the Constitutional Court may not belong to another constitutional body of the state or the federal government.

In implementation of the provisions of Article 112 of the Constitution of the State of Brandenburg, the Law on the Constitutional Court of the State of Brandenburg (Gesetz über das Verfassungsgericht des Landes Brandenburg – VerfGGBbg) contains, among other things, detailed provisions on the election, the personal requirements that the members of the Constitutional Court must fulfill, the oath of office to be taken, compensation, early retirement of constitutional judges from office and the incompatibility of the office of constitutional judge with other activities. For example, civil servants and other members of the public service, with the exception of judges and professors at a German university, cannot be members of the Constitutional Court. In addition, constitutional judges can leave office at any time at their own request.

== Jurisdiction of the Constitutional Court ==
According to Article 113 of the State Constitution, the Constitutional Court decides in particular on:

- Disputes between organs of the state,
- Abstract norm controls against state law based on the standard of the constitution,
- Concrete norm controls against state laws based on the standard of the constitution,
- Constitutional complaints (by individuals due to violation of fundamental rights or by municipalities due to violation of municipal self-government).

== Members ==
As of September 2024 the members of the Court are (note: main job/occupation in brackets):

1. Markus Möller, President (Presiding Judge at the Fiscal Court Berlin–Brandenburg)
2. Michael Strauß, Vice President (District Court Judge)
3. Julia Barbara Finck (alias Juli Zeh; writer)
4. Kathleen Heinrich-Reichow (Judge at the Social Court)
5. Christine Kirbach (District Court Judge)
6. Andreas Koch (Judge at the Federal Administrative Court)
7. Thomas Gerald Müller (Lawyer)
8. Alexander Richter (Judge at the Social Court)
9. Karen Sokoll (Lawyer)

== Former members ==
Former members of the court are:

- Hans-Herbert von Arnim, 1993–1996
- Ulrich Becker, 2011–2021
- Michael Dawin, 2004–2011 (Vice-President 2009–2011)
- Andreas Dielitz, 2009–2019
- Matthias Dombert, 1993–2009
- Andreas Dresen, 2012–2023
- Christine Fuchsloch, 2009–2019
- Beate Harms-Ziegler, 1993–2009
- Florian Havemann, 1999–2009
- Sarina Jegutidse, 1999–2009
- Wolfgang Knippel, 1993–2009 (as Vice-President)
- Dirk Lammer, 2010–2021
- Peter Macke, 1993–2004 (as President)
- Ralf Mitzner, 1993–1999
- Jes Möller, 2009–2019 (President 2012–2019)
- Kerstin Nitsche, 2009–2019 (Vice-President 2011–2019)
- Sigrid Partikel, 2009–2019
- Rüdiger Postier, 2009–2012 (as President)
- Kristina Schmidt, 2009–2019
- Karl-Heinz Schöneburg, 1993–1999
- Volkmar Schöneburg, 2006–2009
- Richard Schröder, 1993–2009
- Monika Weisberg-Schwarz, 1993–2009 (President 2004–2009)
- Rosemarie Will, 1996–2006
