= Matula (2017 film) =

- Directed by: Thorsten Näter
- Written by: Ben Braeunlich
- Based on: A Case for Two
- Cinematography: Joachim Hesse
- Edited by: Julia von Frihling
- Music by: Axel Donner
- Release date: April 14, 2017 (ZDF)
- Running time: 88 minutes
- Country: Germany
- Language: German

Matula is a 2017 German television film and a spin-off of the detective series A Case for Two (German: Ein Fall für zwei), where the protagonist of the film Josef Matula was last seen in 2013. The film premiered on ZDF on 14 April 2017 (Good Friday).

== Plot ==
After Dr. Markus Lessing has gone to South America and Matula's apartment is destroyed in a fire, Matula returns to his job as a private detective and works as a store detective in Frankfurt. One day, when Matula has just been fired, he is visited by Dr. Claas Jessen, who employs him to help Professor Agathe Wolert, an old friend of his, in Cuxhaven. Professor Wolert is a professor emerita, who lives in a senior residence in Cuxhaven. Matula goes on a trip in his mobile home and is accompanied by a blind passenger: a terrier dog to be exact. The dog will not leave Matula's side, so he takes the it with him against his will. When Matula and the dog arrive at the senior residence, they find Professor Agathe Wolert dead. Matula must now explain Professor Wolert's death to Dr. Claas Jessen and speculates that she was working on preventing an environmental conspiracy.

Matula goes to search for the institute where Professor Wolert had last worked at and gets to know her successor Professor Lech and his supposed doctorant Helen Petersen. The environmentalist Ann-Gret Dahus has accused Professor Lech of "having been paid". Matula searches Professor Wolert's room in secret and finds a draft for a scientific study. A resident of the residency suggests to him that Professor Wolert had recently been visited by a young woman. During the conversation with the environmentalist Matula finds out that the raw data of the latter experience contradict the study he found. When coming back to his mobile home, Matula is violently robbed of the data he took with him. Professor Lech denies having falsified the study and instead claims that Professor Wolert helped him with the study, that it was all for the benefit of the institute and mentions someone called Heike. Matula's employer, who turns out having employed him under a false name, terminates his contract with him.

Matula now becomes really interested. During an online search he finds out that Professor Wolert has made publications together with Heike Petersen. He discovers her private address and there he meets Helen Petersen, who turns out to be the daughter of Heike Petersen, who committed suicide years ago. Heike Petersen had worked together with Wolert, Lech and a fourth person. Helen Petersen admits having been the last person to visit Professor Wolert and that her death was an accident. During a break-in to the former house doctor of Helen's mother it appears she had been raped.

When Matula is going to meet Professor Lech, he finds him dead in his apartment. It looks like Professor Lech has committed suicide, and soon Matula spots a man running out of the house. Matula finds out from an old newspaper article with photographs that the fourth person is Dr. Klaus Arendt, Matula's employer. Matula's mobile home is destroyed in a fire.

Helen Petersen finds out that the women's representative was Ann-Gret Dahus. Matula manages to prevent her from dying in an accident orchestrated by Arendt. It now becomes clear that Arendt was the rapist and is trying to hide his dark past to save his political career.

Arendt kidnaps Matula from his boat and throws him into the North Sea. Matula survives this and awakens during low tide on a mudflat. He runs ashore to save Helen. He does not find Helen in her house but instead finds his dog, who takes him to Helen who is lying on the beach tied up. Out of sight, Arendt is digging a hole to bury her corpse there. Matula tries to free Helen, but Arendt surprises her and points his gun at her. The dog attacks Arendt and bites him on the arm, causing him to drop his gun. Helen grabs this and forces her father to run onto the mudflat.

At the end of the film Matula and the dog ride on a ferry back to the continent and there he decides to name the dog after they have been through so much together. He names the dog Dr. Renz in honour of the first attorney he worked with in the 1980s: Dr. Dieter Renz.

== Background ==
The film mostly takes place in Bremerhaven. Matula's last case in the show A Case for Two was the episode Letze Worte ("Last words") shown in March 2013. At that time Gärtner had appeared in a total of 300 episodes since 1981, for a total of 32 years, when he left the show in 2013 at the age of 70. Gärtner's role as Josef Matula made him one of the best known characters and one of the longest-serving people in German television.

== Cast ==
- Claus Theo Gärtner: Josef Matula
- Sinja Dieks: Helen Petersen
- Ulrike Krumbiegel: Ann-Gret Dahus
- Götz Schubert: Dr. Klaus Arendt (alias Dr. Claas Jessen)
- Thomas Sarbacher: Rolf Lech
- Lutz Herkenrath: Dr. Hans Zerbaum
- Anna Böttcher: Gesine Franke
- Josephine Ehlert: Marianne Corda
- Benjamin Morik: Wilfried Bauer
- Willi Gerk: Dustin
- Torsten Hammann: Wolfgang Nitz
- Josef Heynert: Chief inspector Hartmut Kruse
- Bernd Gajkowski: Pförtner
- Renate Delfs: Johanna Fahner
- Guido A. Schick: Vries
