= Robert Havemann =

German chemist and dissident (1910–1982)

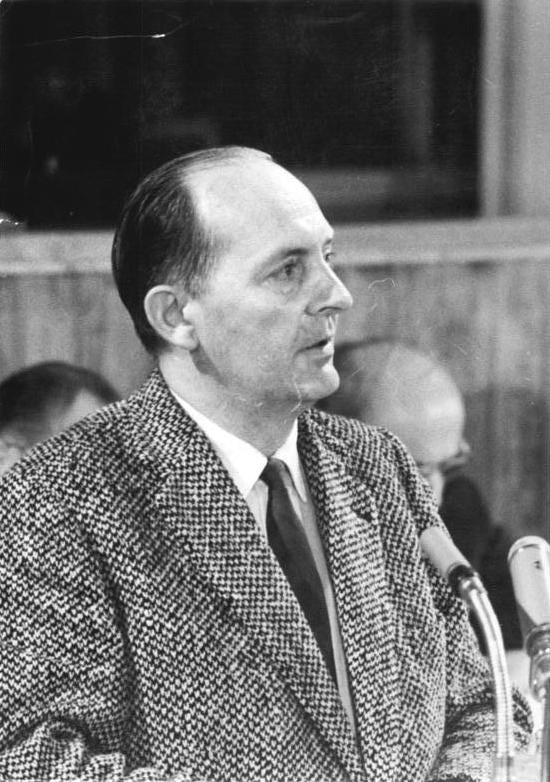
- Havemann in 1960
- Born: 11 March 1910; Munich, Kingdom of Bavaria, German Empire
- Died: 9 April 1982 (aged 72); Grünheide, East Germany
- Education: Kaiser Wilhelm Institute
- Spouse(s): 1: Antje Hasenclever 1934; 2. Karin von Trotha 1949; 3: Annedore Grafe 1974
- Scientific career
- Fields: Chemistry

Robert Havemann (German: [ˈʁoːbɛʁt ˈhaːvəˌman]; 11 March 1910 – 9 April 1982) was an East German chemist, physicist, and dissident.

== Life and career ==
He studied chemistry in Berlin and Munich from 1929 to 1933, and then later received a doctorate in physical chemistry from the Kaiser Wilhelm Institute.

Havemann joined the Communist Party of Germany (KPD) in 1932 and was one of the founders of the resistance group, European Union. It was in connection with this group that he was arrested by the Gestapo in 1943. He received a death sentence for treason, but his execution was continually postponed because of the intervention of former colleagues, who insisted that Havemann was as important due to his work on chemical weapons and that he was still needed to explain the research. His execution was postponed so many times, he was able to survive until the Brandenburg-Görden Prison was liberated by the Red Army.

After the war, he became head of administration in the Kaiser Wilhelm Institute for Physical Chemistry and Electrochemistry in Berlin, but in 1948 he was dismissed from this position due to political pressure from the American authorities in West Berlin. He continued his scientific work in the institute until he got barred from his laboratory in January 1950.

He then became a professor of physical chemistry at the Humboldt University of Berlin. He became a member of the Volkskammer in 1950 and won one of the GDR's national prizes in 1959. He published articles in Sinn und Form criticizing modern socialism and revisionist works of the Western authors.

In 1963 he lectured on 'Scientific Aspects of Philosophical Problems' (published as 'Dialectic without Dogmatism—Natural Sciences against Communistic Ideology') and was expelled from the ruling Socialist Unity Party and dismissed from the University—officially because he gave an interview to a newspaper from West Germany.

His son Florian Havemann (born 12 January 1952 in East Berlin) fled to West Germany in 1971.

Havemann was a victim of the Stasi's Zersetzung psychological warfare program.

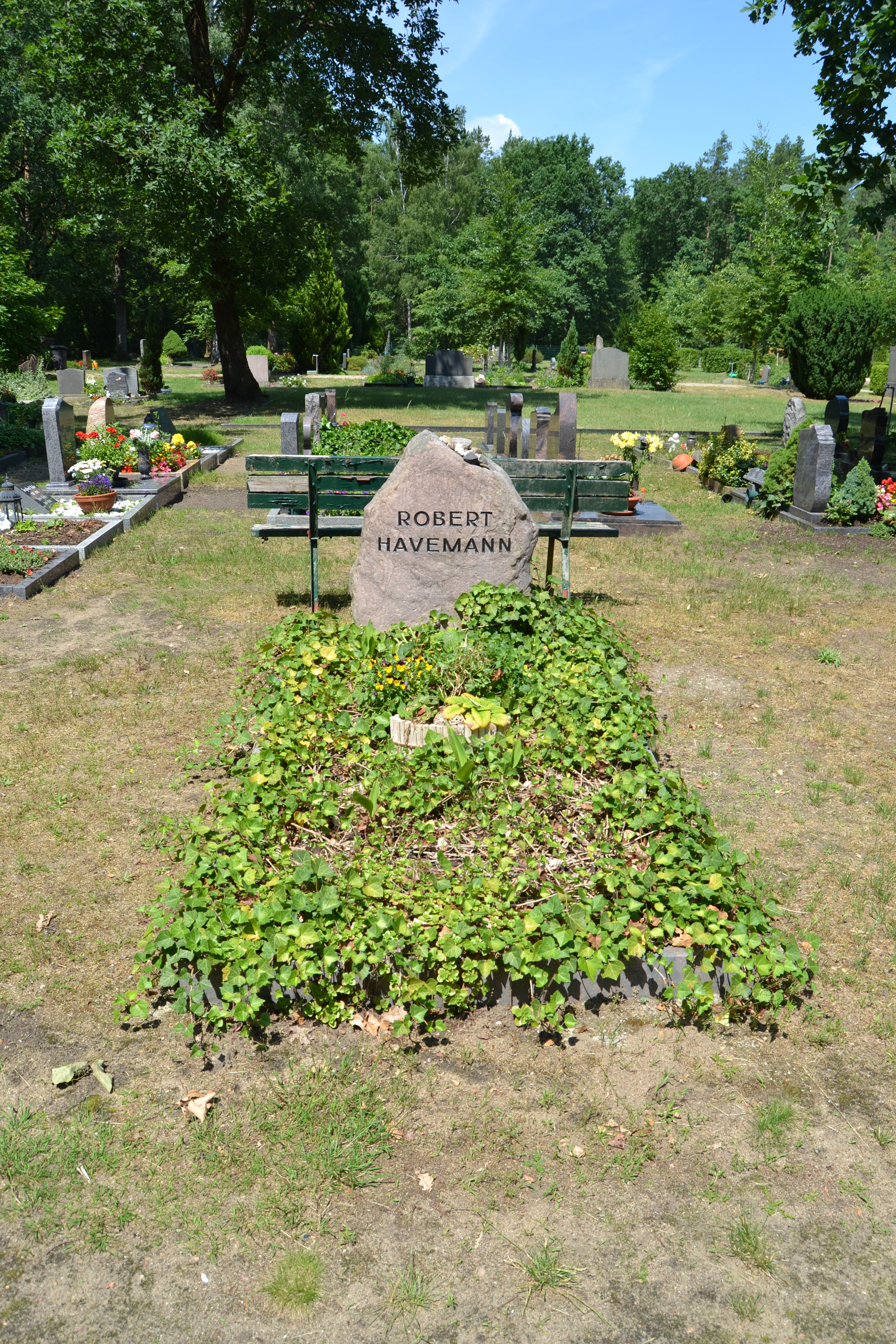
Grave at the Waldfriedhof Grünheide

He continued his work as a socialist critic and was put under house arrest in 1976, at his home in the village of Grünheide. This continued until his death in 1982, after a long time suffering from lung disease.

In 1989 he was politically rehabilitated by the Socialist Unity Party of Germany's Central Party Control Commission.

In 2005, Havemann was awarded the title Righteous among the Nations by the Israeli Holocaust memorial, Yad Vashem.
