= CoCo Brown =

American actress

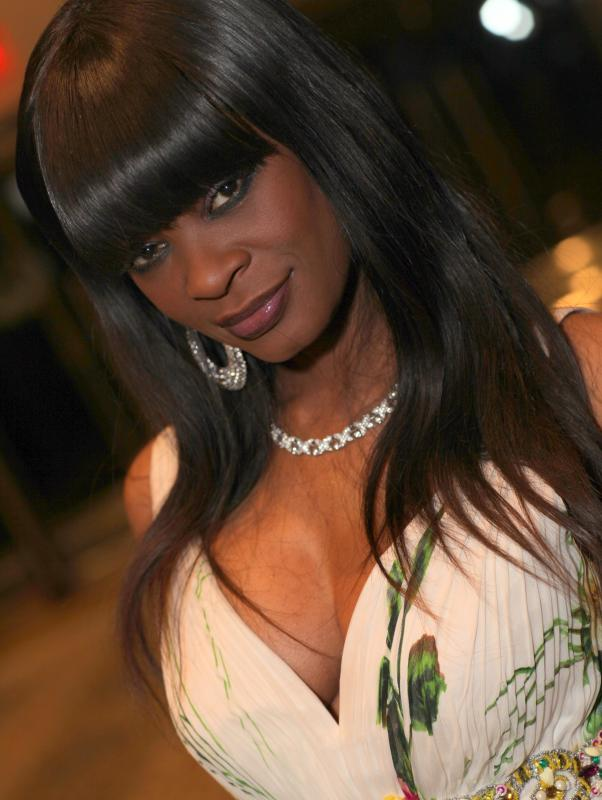
- Brown at the AVN Awards, 2013
- Occupations: Rapper; disc jockey; former pornographic film actress
- Notable work: Antibodies, Black Panty Chronicles 2

CoCo Brown is an American rapper, DJ, and former pornographic film actress. Brown has also acted in a German crime thriller film written and directed by Christian Alvart.

== Early life ==
Brown spent part of her childhood in Toledo, Ohio and moved to Las Vegas with her family when she was in middle school. At age 15, she ran away from home and never returned.

== Career ==
=== Adult entertainment ===
Brown once worked briefly as a dominatrix. She stopped performing in adult films in 2003.

=== Music ===
Brown launched a rap music career after quitting porn and later worked as a DJ.

== Suborbital flight ==
Brown had signed up to go on a suborbital flight in 2016, which would have lasted approximately one hour and would have provided 90 seconds of weightlessness. The flight was to have been arranged by the Space Expedition Corporation (SXC), a Netherlands-based space tourism company. This opportunity for her arose in 2012 when she received a "space luncheon" invite by a concierge she knew after another person canceled their appearance at the event. She began training for the flight, with help from XCOR Aerospace, that same year. In preparation for the trip, she had to earn a pilot's license. She was to have been the flight's co-pilot. If the trip had taken place as planned, she would have been the first pornographic actress on a suborbital high altitude flight. XCOR ceased operations and filed for bankruptcy in 2017 without flying a single person on their Lynx spaceplane.

== Personal life ==
Brown met her future husband while working in Las Vegas as a stripper. She later moved to Germany with her son from a previous relationship.

== Filmography ==
Film
| Year | Title | Role | Notes |
|---|---|---|---|
| 2005 | Antibodies | Michelle | Crime thriller film |

== Awards and nominations ==
Venus Awards
| Year | Result | Award |
|---|---|---|
| 2002 | Won | Best New Actress (Germany) |
| 2003 | Nominated | Best Actress (Germany) |
