= Florian Havemann =

German painter (born 1952)

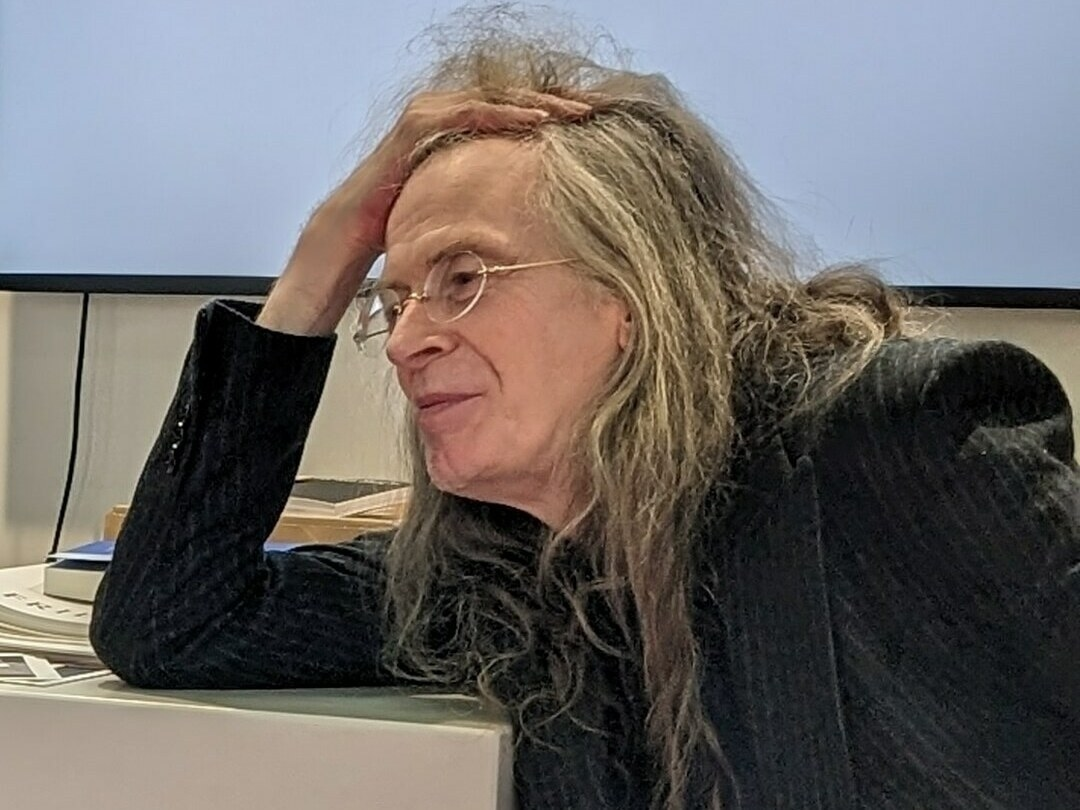
- Havemann at Frankfurt Book Fair in 2023
- Born: January 12, 1952 (age 74); East Berlin, East Germany
- Occupations: judge, writer, painter, composer
- Parent(s): Robert Havemann, Karin von Trotha

Florian Havemann (born 12 January 1952 in East Berlin) is the son of East German dissident Robert Havemann.

== Biography ==
He is a German writer, painter and composer. He is also a judge at the Constitutional Court of Brandenburg.

He fled to West Germany during the Cold War and was the subject of the song "Enfant perdu" ("Lost child") by Wolf Biermann. In the song, Biermann mocked Havemann for fleeing East Germany and thus deserting socialism.

In 2023 he co-authored the novel Begabung usw with his lover Hanna Lakomy.

== Sources ==
- Website von Florian Havemann (not updated since 2002)
- Biografische Daten beim Landesverfassungsgericht Brandenburg
- Zeitschrift für unfertige Gedanken
- F.A.Z.-Artikel über das Buch "Havemann" vom 25. Jan. 2008
- Schreiattacken gegen Papas Erbe
