= Reinhard Lakomy =

German singer and songwriter

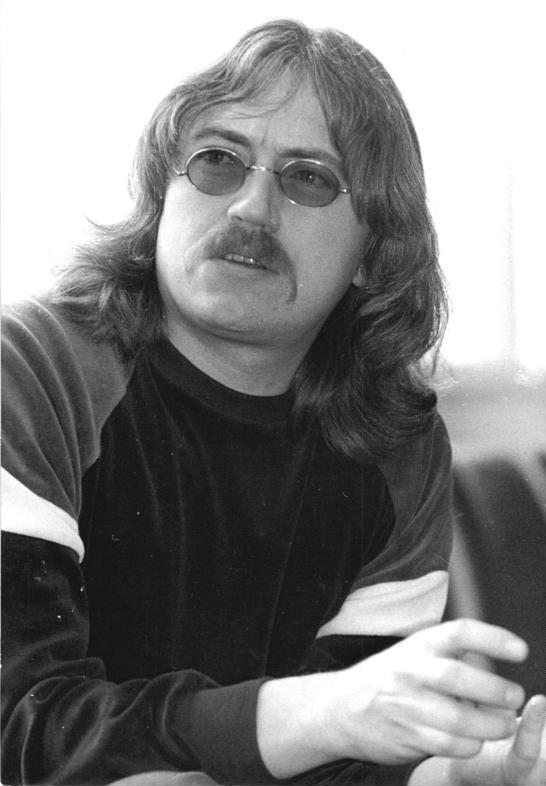

Reinhard Lakomy (19 January 1946 in Magdeburg, Germany – 23 March 2013 in Berlin, Germany) was a German-language composer, pianist, singer-songwriter, and arranger. His musical styles ranged from pop, jazz, and electronic music to radio plays and musicals for children. In the German Democratic Republic, Lakomy was one of the artists with the most official releases next to the Puhdys. His most famous works include the audio musical for children "Der Traumzauberbaum", which he co-produced with his wife, Monika Ehrhardt. His daughter Hanna Lakomy participated in the 1992 children's music album Der Wasserkristall.

== Discography ==
=== EPs ===
- Mädchen, mir kommt's verdächtig vor | Es war doch nicht das erste Mal (1972, Amiga)
- Und ich geh' in den Tag | Wenn du gehst (1973, Amiga)
- Du könntest mein Mädchen sein | Autofahren (1973, Amiga)
- Mir doch egal | Ein irrer Typ (1975, Amiga)
- Klavierstunde | Manchmal find' ich keinen Schlaf (1975, Amiga)
- Es war doch nicht das erste Mal (EP, 1983, Amiga)

=== LPs ===
as the Lakomy-Ensemble

- Reinhard Lakomy (1973, Amiga)
- Lacky und seine Geschichten (1974, Amiga)
- Lackys Dritte (1975, Amiga)
- daß kein Reif ... (1976, Amiga)
- Die großen Erfolge (Best of, 1977, Amiga)

== Literature ==
All titles are in German:

- H. P. Hofmann (1977), Beat Lexikon. Interpreten, Autoren, Sachbegriffe (in German), Berlin (Ost): VEB Lied der Zeit Musikverlag
- Jürgen Balitzki (1985), Rock aus erster Hand (in German), Berlin: Lied der Zeit Musikverlag, pp. 79–87
- Rainer Bratfisch: Lakomy, Reinhard. In: Wer war wer in der DDR? 5. Ausgabe. Band 1, Ch. Links, Berlin 2010, ISBN 978-3-86153-561-4.

Autobiography

- Reinhard Lakomy (2000), Es war doch nicht das letzte Mal... Erinnerungen: Verlag Neues Leben (in German), Berlin, ISBN 3-360-00923-1
