= Katja Havemann =

German civil rights activist and author (born 1947)

- Born: Annedore Grafe; 30 November 1947 (age 78); Neubarnim (Letschin), Soviet occupation zone (subsequently GDR)
- Occupations: Peace activist Civil rights activist Author
- Political party: New Forum
- Spouse: Robert Havemann (1910–1982)
- Children: 1

Katja Havemann (born Annedore Grafe; 30 November 1947) is a German civil rights activist and author.

== Early life ==
Annedore Grafe was born into a peasant family in Neubarnim (Letschin) in a rural region on the left bank of the Oder river, at that time part of the Soviet occupation zone, and on the "German" side of the newly repositioned frontier with Poland. She attended the local school between 1954 and 1964, and then undertook a traineeship in animal husbandry, till 1967 at the agriculture college in Neuenhagen a short distance to the east of Berlin. In 1967, she moved on to the prestigious "Bruno Leuschner" Economic Academy in Berlin. However, after a year she voluntarily abandoned her course and in 1968 took work at a Berlin orphanage.

== Marriage, early career ==
In 1973, she successfully completed a training as a home educationist in Hohenprießnitz (near Leipzig). By this time, back in Berlin, she had become part of a circle of intellectuals – artists and writers – critical of the ruling party. She first met the scientist and high-profile political and civil rights activist Robert Havemann (1910–1982) in 1970 at the apartment of the songwriter Wolf Biermann, another prominent political dissident. She married Havemann in 1974. Their daughter Franziska had been born the previous year. Annedore Grafe marked her marriage by changing not merely her family name, but also her first name: Annedore Grafe now became Katja Havemann.

== House arrest ==
Katja Havemann supported her husband in his dangerous work as a political writer in the German Democratic Republic and shared in the mounting surveillance and other destructive actions to which they were routinely subjected by officers of the Ministry for State Security, including slightly more than two years under house arrest between 1976 and 1979. In numerous critical articles and quotations that appeared in the western media, Robert Havemann's managed to share the basis of his opposition to the political structure in East Germany. His opposition centred on the assertion of one-party power by the SED (party) in the German Democratic Republic. He rejected this as dogmatic and undemocratic.

During the 1970s and 1980s there were times when she stayed at home as a "housewife", while at other times she supported the family budget working variously as a home educator, in a motor vehicle service centre and in a small ceramics factory which by 1982 she had set up with her friend and political ally, the artist Bärbel Bohley. Over the years Katja Havemann established political contacts with numerous opposition figures in East Germany.

== Widowhood, continued activism ==
Thirty-seven years younger than her husband, she was widowed in 1982, after which she continued with her political opposition to the SED régime. In 1982, she was a co-founder in East Germany of "Women for Peace" ("Frauen für den Frieden"), together with Ulrike Poppe und Bärbel Bohley. Inspiration for the initiative came from the Women's Peace Movement in Northern Ireland and, more immediately, from an enhanced military service law in East Germany which was enacted, without warning or prior discussion, by the national parliament ("Volkskammer") on 25 March 1982, and which opened the way for women to be subject to compulsory military conscription. In 1986 Katja Havemann became a member of the newly emerging Initiative for Peace and Human Rights, widely seen as the first East German opposition group established outside the state and he church, and thereby a precursor to surge in street protests and other changes which led to German reunification, formally in October 1990.

== Re-unification ==
In 1989 Katja Havemann still lived at Grünheide on the eastern edge of Berlin, in the house where she had made her home with her husband, and it was here on 10 September 1989 that together with Bärbel Bohley und Rolf Henrich she founded the "citizen's movement", New Forum. In some respects New Forum was a cross between a political party and a mass organisation. However, in East Germany political parties and mass movements were controlled by the ruling SED (party). New Forum was not. In the couple of months that followed it gave a decisive impulse to what became known as the Peaceful Revolution, including the end of the one- party state power structure and, slightly more than a year after New Forum's foundation, the "accession" of the German Democratic Republic into an (enlarged and, over time, adapted) German Federal Republic. One important reason that New Forum caught the spirit of the times and developed so rapidly involved growing awareness and indignation over the obvious falsification of East German election results which, starting on 4 September 1989, gave rise to a sustained surge in the street protests.

In September 1990, during the immediate build-up to reunification, Katja Havemann was one of around 20 activist demonstrators who barricaded themselves inside the building of the former Stasi main office alongside the Normannenstraße in East Berlin. The object of the exercise was to ensure the contents of the Stasi files remained accessible for future political and historical research. There was a real concern that the Stasi archives would either be quietly destroyed or else disappear into an archive and remain inaccessible to researchers and to the millions of East German citizens whom, it was correctly presumed, they directly concerned. The demonstrators backed up their demands with a hunger strike, and gained massive support from the population, the media, and politicians as news of their action spread. Equivalent popular actions took place in other cities, in order to try and prevent former Stasi officers from incinerating the vast quantities of paper-based records accumulated during four decades. On 3 October 1990, just hours before the formal implementation of reunification, the authorities agreed to the demonstrators' demands, which were enshrined in the Stasi Records Law which came into force the next year, and the creation of the Stasi Records Agency.

== Charitable work and legacy of East Germany ==
During the early 1990s she withdrew from politics, focusing instead on various projects involving handicapped and other disadvantaged young people. She nevertheless also joined with other political activists from the "GDR times" in campaigning against cover-up strategies of former Stasi officers and collaborators. In addition, she became particularly engaged in the debates surrounding the presumed, albeit vehemently denied, backstairs entanglements of the former SED (party) politician Gregor Gysi who successfully relaunched himself as a leading PDS (left-wing party) reformer, following the demise of the German Democratic Republic. Havemann's demands for greater transparency from Gysi about his past appear to have been intensified because during the 1970s and 1980s, as a defence attorney, Gysi had represented the Havemanns and several of their dissident comrades in East German courts.

== Prosecution witness against Stasi defendants ==
Between 1995 and 2000 Katja Havemann was the leading prosecution witness in a criminal case at the regional courts in Frankfurt (Oder) and Neuruppin. The cases involved two lawyers who, acting under the influence of the SED (party) and, more specifically, between 1976 and 1979 under the direction of the Ministry for State Security ("Stasi"), had sentenced her husband to house arrest "for disturbing public order and security" (wegen "Störung der öffentlichen Ordnung und Sicherheit"), and to a fine for "currency transactions" in connection with payments received for his articles in the western media. The outcomes of the cases were convictions for the two former government lawyers, who had received suspended sentences. Invited to criticise the leniency of the sentence, Havemann assured an interviewer that her motive had been for justice, not revenge. What was important for her was that it had finally been established that Erich Honecker had not been the only person responsible for injustices in the German Democratic Republic ("...dass endlich festgestellt wurde, dass nicht nur Honecker verantwortlich für Unrecht in der DDR war"). It had been possible for the system to function as it did only "because many people knowingly involved themselves" ("weil viele ganz bewusst mitmachten").

== Awards and honours ==
This is not necessarily a complete list.

- 8 October 1995 Order of Merit of the Federal Republic of Germany First class
