= Matula (surname) =

Matula (Czech feminine: Matulová) is a Slavic surname. As a Polish surname, it can me derived either from nickname matula, a tender form of "mother", or from diminutive Matula, from Macijej (Matthew) It may refer to:

== People ==
- David Matula (born 1937), American mathematician and computer scientist
- Iosif Matula (born 1958), Romanian engineer and politician
- Kim Matula (born 1988), American actress
- Milan Matula (born 1984), Czech footballer
- Nelli Matula (born 1995), Finnish singer
- Rick Matula (born 1953), American baseball player
- Sonny Matula, Philippine lawyer and labor leader
- Vili Matula (born 1962), Croatian actor
- Vlasta Matulová (1918–1989), Czech actress

== Fictional characters ==
- Josef Matula, a character from the German television show Ein Fall für Zwei
