= Thom Kubli =

Thom Kubli (born 1969, Frankfurt am Main) is a Swiss-German composer and artist known for installation art and sculptures that often deploy sound as a significant element, using digital technologies and material configurations that increase the viewers' spatial perception.

== Biography ==
Kubli was affiliated with creating music from an early age while growing up in Heidelberg, Germany.

He learned how to play the piano and guitar and later began working with multitrack recording, midi-sequencers and keyboards during the 1980s. In the early 1990s, he produced electronic music for labels such as Harthouse and Source Records. He became internationally known under his pseudonym Planet Jazz. and True Frequencies, the latter in collaboration with Boris Hiesserer. In the mid-1990s he turned towards experimental performances and productions that researched the nexus between sound and various visual media.

After moving to Cologne in 1998, he studied at the Academy of Media Arts Cologne from 1999 to 2004, where he became influenced by post-structural philosophy. He expanded his artistic practice by embedding new materials such as plants, collagen and genetically engineered biomass. At this time, he also began using software and transmission technology as artistic media. He also began an exchange with scientists and scientific institutions that would build momentum in his working practice.

In 2002 he developed the work Deterritoriale Schlingen in collaboration with physicist Sven Mann. It was shown at Berlin's Transmediale (2003) and awarded an Honorable Mention. In the same year, he presented the installation piece Virilio Cubes at the Akademie der Künste in Berlin. In 2004, he showed the installation Determinale Verschweifungen with Sven Mann as a solo show at the New Museum of Contemporary Art in New York City.

Subsequently, he exhibited works at Museum Kunstpalast Düsseldorf (2004); Eyebeam in New York City (2005); Transmediale in Berlin (2005); and Laboratorio Arte Alameda in Mexico City (2009). In 2010 he received a production stipend from EMPAC, Troy, for the work Float!Thinktank 21. The installation was exhibited in the same year at EMPAC and at Marian Spore in New York City.

In 2012, he produced the piece Black Hole Horizon in cooperation with the Rensselaer Polytechnic Institute as part of a further production stipend at EMPAC. The overall development of the installation took approximately four years. Black Hole Horizon was presented at Kunstverein Ingolstadt (2015), Ars Electronica in Linz (2016), FILE-Festival in São Paulo (2017), and The Lowry in Manchester (2017).

Since 2003, Thom Kubli has been working as a composer, director and author for several European broadcast stations such as WDR, SWR, ORF and SRF.

He directed over 20 feature- and radioplay productions and contributed over 30 radioplay compositions.

== Awards and grants ==
In 2003 and 2005, Thom Kubli was awarded an Honorable Mention from Transmediale in Berlin. In 2003 he received a stipend from Junge Akademie der Künste in Berlin and won the first prize in the ‘Interaction’ category at the Viper Festival in Basel, Switzerland. He received a research-stipend from EMPAC in 2005 and from TESLA in Berlin in 2006. He was awarded a production stipend from Kunststiftung NRW in 2009. In 2010, he was given the Jaffe Fund for Experimental Media and Performing Arts within the framework of a production stipend at EMPAC. In 2012, he received another production stipend at EMPAC.

== Selected works and projects ==
=== Black Hole Horizon ===
For Black Hole Horizon Thom Kubli developed an arrangement of three sculptures that resemble ship hornets. Through a delicate electromechanical construction each hornet is able to create a huge soap bubble while producing a tone. The various sizes and forms of the hornets produce three different pitches. The audience can walk through the installation site witnessing the transformation of sound into ephemeral sculptures that continuously reconfigure the space. The construction of the hornet sculptures began in 2012 in collaboration with the Rensselaer Poytechnic Institute in Troy. A first version of the installation was shown at EMPAC in 2012. After further research and development, Black Hole Horizon was presented at Ars Electronica in Linz (2016), FILE in São Paulo (2017) and The Lowry in Manchester (2017).

=== Float! Thinktank 21 ===
Commissioned by EMPAC in 2010, Thom Kubli created Float! Thinktank21 to draft the correlation between politics and zero-gravity. The installation piece consists of a flotation tank, a sound composition, an archive of audio performances by the artist, and a context table filled with books referring to the theme of weightlessness. Within the sensory deprivation tank, the audience listens to an underwater sound piece that invokes micro-gravity as a model for explorative political thought.

The composition frames a period of silence and sensory deprivation with a spoken word intro and outro that is played back via an underwater sound system. An individual session in the tank lasts approximately 50 minutes. Float!Thinktank21 was exhibited at EMPAC (7) in early 2010, followed by a presentation at Marian Spore in New York City from August until December 2010.

=== New York INSIDE ===
This intimate and contemplative work is a pure acoustic piece. Kubli used field recordings that were captured in the interior of an apartment block in New York City. In a dense arrangement, he juxtaposes small noises from daily private routines with the sounds of the urban exterior that are filtered through the apartment's physical properties. New York INSIDE was broadcast at WDR3 Ars Acustica in 2016.

Kubli conveyed the composition into an artistic script through a written transcription of the noises and sounds that were deployed (2017).

=== Record Attempt ===
The performance piece Record Attempt presents an environment dedicated to performing the “longest guitar solo ever played“. In a closed architectural space and in presence of a notary, a performer attempts to outplay the current world record. The audience can witness the attempt at the exhibition site through a spyhole in one of the walls. Simultaneously, the performance is transmitted as a video stream over the internet. The first record was set by Kubli in 2008 at Philipp von Rosen Galerie in Cologne. Another performance of Record Attempt was presented at MARCO in Vigo (2012) and LABoral, Gijon (2012), as a competition that was open to the public. The Australian Broadcasting Corporation (ABC1) featured the “longest guitar solo ever played“ in its TV-Series Spicks and Specks in 2011.

=== Monochrome Transporter ===
This piece was commissioned for the traveling exhibition What Sound Does a Color Make? hosted by Independent Curators International and curated by Kathleen Forde. Based on a digital image of a monochrome blue painting by Yves Klein, Kubli projected an acoustic interpretation of the visual parameters onto the exhibition space. A multi-channel speaker setup allowed the audience to be submerged within the sonic representation. Monochrome Transporter was presented at Eyebeam in New York City (2005), followed by exhibitions at Wood Street Galleries in Pittsburgh (2005) and Govett-Brewster Art Gallery in New Zealand (2006)

=== Deterritoriale Schlingen ===
This large-scale installation piece consists of a miniature radio broadcast station that operates multiple senders on various frequencies and an assemblage of up to 60 radio receivers that are positioned in an exhibition space. Deterritoriale Schlingen overrides the signal of the local radio stations with its own broadcast, establishing an information sovereignty within the realm of the exhibition site and its neighbouring facilities.

The broadcast of Deterritoriale Schlinge consists of a multichannel audio composition. The disposed sound materials are field recordings of cultural environments and events, fragments of pop music and electronic beatloops, and excerpts of post-structuralist speeches. The audience can interact within the installation setting by retuning reception channels of individual radio receivers and thus alter the acoustic experience within the space.

The piece was produced and performed in collaboration with physicist Sven Mann.

It included a performance by philosopher Nils Röller at a presentation at Urbandrift in Berlin (2002). Later, it was shown at Transmediale in Berlin (2003), Viper Festival in Basel (2003) and Ars Electronica in Linz (2003). An iteration of the installation was presented as Determinale Verschweifungen at the New Museum of Contemporary Art in New York City (2004).

=== Works with Collagen ===
Geliege (2002) is an oblong sculpture consisting of collagen with loudspeaker torsos cast inside. When presented the work can be touched by the audience. In the course of time, the sculpture changes its form and appearance through dehydration and anaerobic bacterial processes. Kubli conceptualized that the technical functionality of the work will be terminated at a certain point by biological processes.

Virilio Cubes (2003) consists of five square-cut collagen objects with sound drivers cast inside. The collagen blocks are dispersed across the exhibition space so that the audience can walk between them. The sounds that are emitted from the cubes consist of urban skateboard rides. The five sound sources create a psychoacoustic impression of skateboards maneuvring through the space and around the participant. Virilio Cubes was shown for the first time at Akademie der Künste in 2003 together with the Geliege. The latter work was at this point presented in a state beyond technical functionality.

Due to the transient nature of the objects, Kubli freshly produced Virilio Cubes for shows at Kunsthalle Darmstadt (2004), Nassauischer Kunstverein Wiesbaden (2007), and Laboratorio Arte Alameda in Mexico City (2009). A whole archive of non-functional collagen objects in various states of organic development had been presented at Kunsthalle Darmstadt in 2004.

=== Plantworks ===
Early works by Kubli investigate the correlation of plants and biomass with electronic and digital circuitry. Plantworks I-III (2002-2003) consist of arrangements of real and artificial plants that control small sound circuits. They constitute miniature ecosystems that influence the quality of sounds that are produced by solar driven oscillators. Expositionssystem (2005) is an installation that deploys genetically engineered pepper plants within the context of a scientific experimental setup, which speculates on the development of genetically identical plants that are exposed to various sonic milieus.

== Selected solo exhibitions ==
- 2019 Radiosands, HeK/Haus der elektronischen Künste, Basel
- 2019 Radiosands, Haus am Lützowplatz, Berlin
- 2015 Black Hole Horizon, Kunstverein Ingolstadt, Ingolstadt
- 2012 Black Hole Horizon, EMPAC, Troy/New York
- 2008 Record Attempt, Figge Von Rosen Galerie, Köln
- 2006 Global Contentifier, Open Studio, Tesla, Berlin
- 2005 Monochrome Transporter, Galerie Rachel Haferkamp, Köln
- 2004 Determinale Verschweifungen, New Museum of Contemporary Art, New York

== Selected group exhibitions ==
- 2019 Human Limitations – Limited Humanity, Ars Electronica, Linz
- 2018 Cultures Électronique et Arts Numériques, Scopitone Festival, Nantes
- 2017 Bubbling Universes, FILE Sáo Paulo
- 2017 Humansbeingdigital, The Lowry, Manchester
- 2016 Alchemists Of Our Time, Ars Electronica, Linz
- 2016 More Than Lovers, More Than Friends, Futura, Prag
- 2014 Marler Medienkunstpreis 2014, Skulpturenmuseum Glaskasten, Marl
- 2012 ACTIVE PRESENCE: Action, Object and Audience, LABoral, Gijon, Spain
- 2010 Dancing on the Ceiling: Art & Zero Gravity, EMPAC, New York
- 2010 Summer Projects, Marian Spore, New York
- 2009 INSIDEOUT, Laboratorio Arte Alameda, Mexico City
- 2008 Sonic Acts XII: Future Cinema, De Balie, Amsterdam
- 2005 What Sound Does a Color Make, Eyebeam, New York
- 2005 BASICS, Transmediale 05, Haus der Kulturen der Welt, Berlin

== Selected radioplay compositions ==
- 2016 New York INSIDE, WDR
- 2015 Die Wupper, Schauspielhaus Düsseldorf
- 2014 Nicht genug, Saarländischer Rundfunk
- 2013 Drei Menschen und das Salz im Meer, Deutschlandfunk Kultur
- 2013 Das Hibernat, WDR
- 2012 Cici-Letters, WDR
- 2010 Zwang. Eine Haft. Eine Notitz., WDR
- 2009 Das Haus, WDR
- 2003 Ich steck' in deinen Ohren, mehr oder weniger, WDR
