= Electronic Language International Festival =

New media arts festival

Coordinates: 10°S 52°W

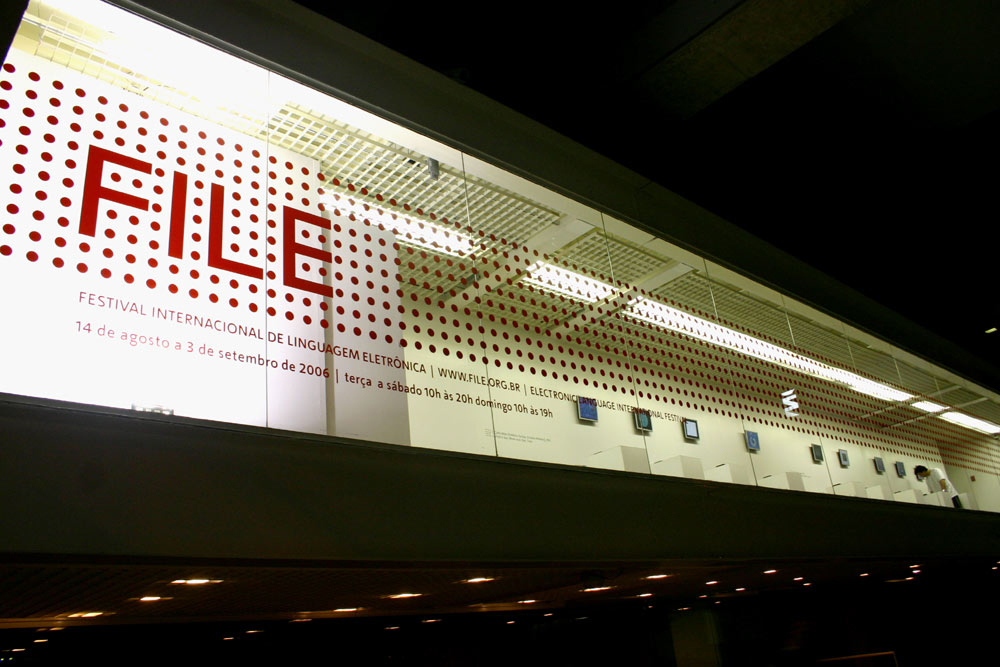
Electronic Language international Festival

The Festival Internacional de Linguagem Eletrônica (FILE; English: Electronic Language International Festival) is a new media arts festival that usually takes place in three cities of Brazil: São Paulo, Rio de Janeiro and Porto Alegre. It has also participated in other events around the world. It is the biggest arts and technology festival in Brazil, and serves as a lead indicator of the plurality of the work created in the interactive art field not only nationally but also internationally.

== Overview ==
FILE is organized by a non-profit group whose purpose is to disseminate and develop culture, arts, technology and scientific research. Its first edition was in 2000. The 17th edition in 2016 brought together 330 works by international artists working in the field of art and technology. Admission to the FILE exhibition is free.

The FILE festival is split into different areas of interest, although some overlap and sub-categorization occurs. The main groups of interest are:

- FILE Prix Lux is an international prize that is granted to professionals in the area of electronic-digital languages. It grants seven prizes (first place, second place, and five honorable mentions) to each of three categories that are: Interactive Art, Digital Language, and Electronic Sonority. Besides the jury's selection, there is a popular vote through the FILE Prix Lux website.
- FILE PAI (Paulista Avenue Interactive = Interactive Public Art) is a project of digital public art that occupies several spaces at Paulista Avenue with interactive works of art. It intends to highlight the significance of interactive public art in order to understand and to absorb the new social phenomena provided by technology and, thus, to constitute strategies to interconnect with those new mass behaviors.
- FILE Exhibition shows a great diversity of national and international research and productions. Artists - among groups, collectives and individual works – participate with productions in the areas of digital culture. In the exhibition, FILE presents some digital and interactive installations, FILE Media Art works, Hypersonica and others.
- FILE Media Art presents digital works that propose ways to explore new technologies as ways of creation and interaction. Films, sites, web and software art show that with digital art, technology can be more than its usual functionality.
- FILE Hipersonica explores the role of music in a technological culture with audio and visual performances.
- FILE Symposium is a collection of lectures by leading artists and technologists on the new media art field.
- FILE Games brings a repertoire of experimental and artistic electronic games. The formats and proposals of the games are developed by independent, national and international producers and firms. Among the participants, there are themes related to biological sciences, challengers of the physics laws and even those that dialog with artistic movements.
- FILE Machinima presents a set of films not built on the reality we live in, but on virtual realities such as digital games' and worlds found on the internet showing a new way of making digital cinema.
- FILE Innovation has the aim of promoting intersections among fields of science, art, and economy through the exhibition of inventions and innovations in a context guided by the concept of creativity and open innovation.
- FILE Archive is a collection of works. It has now more than 2000 in several supports of digital media such as cd-rom, zips, diskettes, and video tape, texts and catalogues.

== Gallery ==

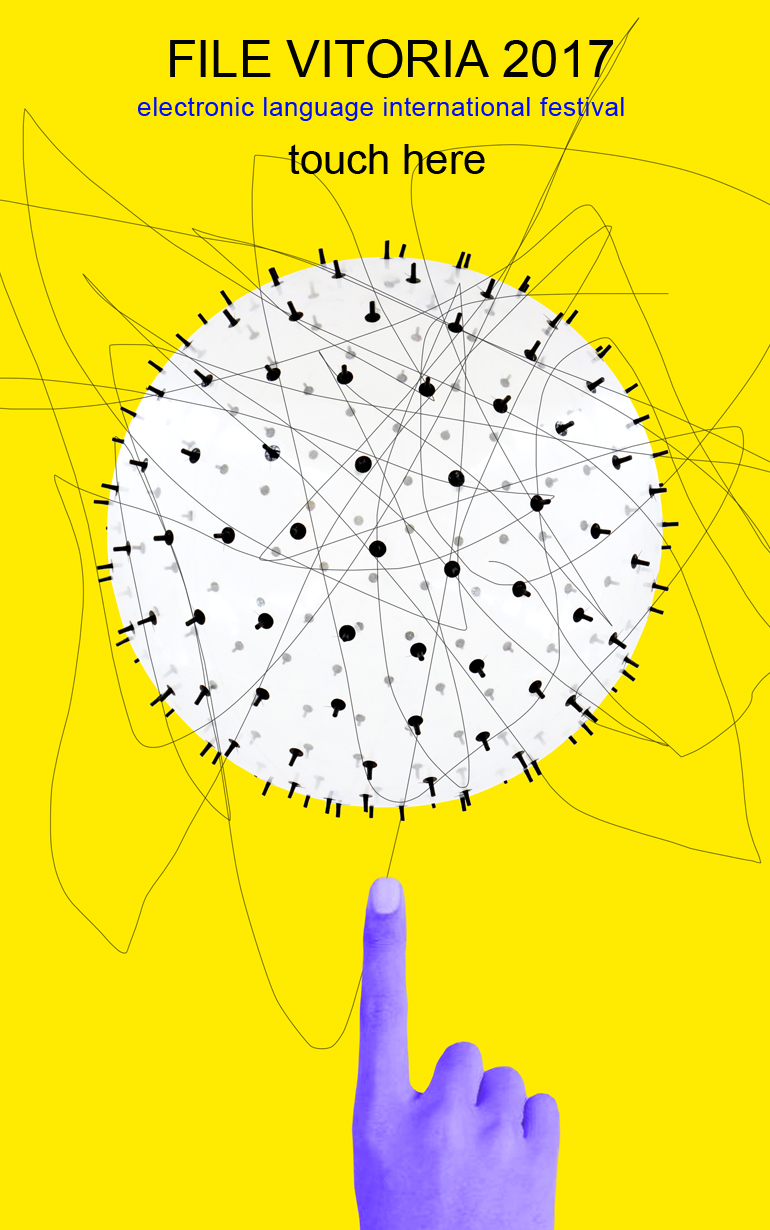

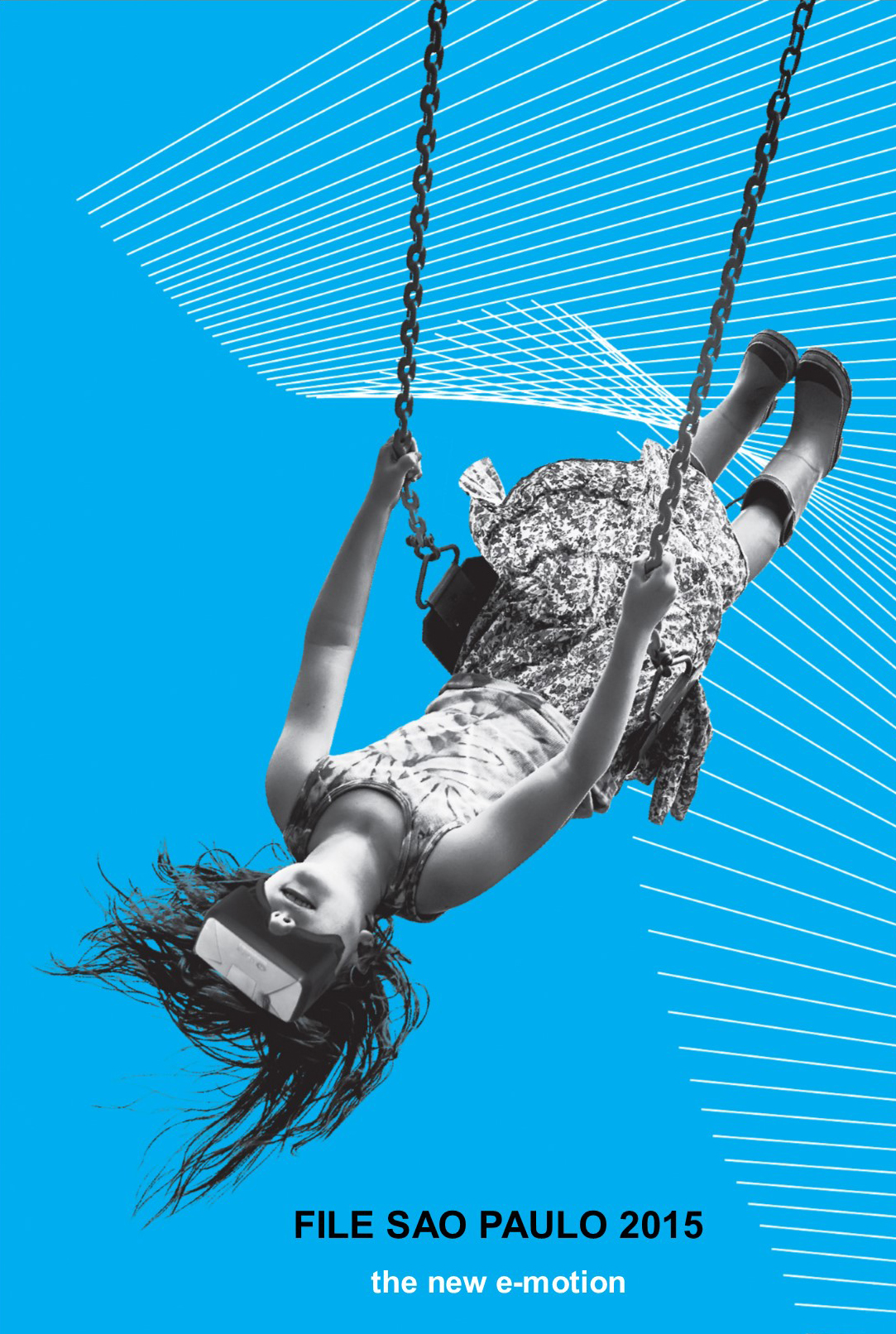

== Bibliography ==
- Ricardo Barreto and Paula Perissinoto.the_culture_of_immanence, in Internet Art. Ricardo Barreto e Paula Perissinotto (orgs.). São Paulo, IMESP, 2002 ISBN 85-7060-038-0.
- Ricardo Barreto and Paula Perissinoto.The Anarcho-Culture in New Media. Ricardo Barreto e Paula Perissinotto (orgs.). São Paulo, IMESP, 2003. ISBN 85-89730-01-8.
- Ricardo Barreto and Paula Perissinoto.The Hyper-Cinemactivity in File2004. Ricardo Barreto e Paula Perissinotto (orgs.). São Paulo, IMESP, 2004. ISBN 85-89730-02-6 .
- Ricardo Barreto and Paula Perissinoto.Teoria Digital
- Ricardo Barreto and Paula Perissinotto.Bubbling Universes FILE-SÃO-PAULO-2017 ISBN 9788589730235
- Ricardo Barreto and Paula Perissinoto. FILE SAO PAULO 2018: The body is the message
- Ricardo Barreto and Paula Perissinoto. FILE RIO DE JANEIRO 2018. D I S R U P T I V A: Electronic Art in the Disruptive Age
- Ricardo Barreto and Paula Perissinoto. FILE SAO PAULO 2019: 20 Years of FILE 20 Years of Art and Technology ISBN 9788589730297

The 2024 edition of the festival, titled FILE 2024: QUBIT AI, took place from 3 July to 25 August 2024 at the Centro Cultural FIESP and SESI Digital Art Gallery on Paulista Avenue in São Paulo, featuring interactive installations and the Sintéticos Estéticos screening program with works by international digital and sound artists including Marc Lee, Klaus Obermaier, and French digital artist and electronic composer Maxime Dallaserra (Journey of Life).
