= Institute for Marxism-Leninism for the Central Committee of the SED =

German research institute

Coordinates: 52.527578°N 13.415605°E

The Marx-Engels-Lenin-Institut was a department of the Central Committee of the Socialist Unity Party of Germany (SED), directly subordinate to the secretary of that committee (Fred Oelßner until 1957 and then Kurt Hager until 1989) and named after its earlier equivalent in Moscow. It was set up in East Berlin in 1949, renamed the Marx-Engels-Lenin-Stalin-Institut on Stalin's death in 1953 and the Institute for Marxism-Leninism for the Central Committee of the SED (German: Institut für Marxismus-Leninismus beim Zentralkomitee der Sozialistischen Einheitspartei Deutschlands, or IML) as a result of early de-Stalinization in 1956.

== History ==
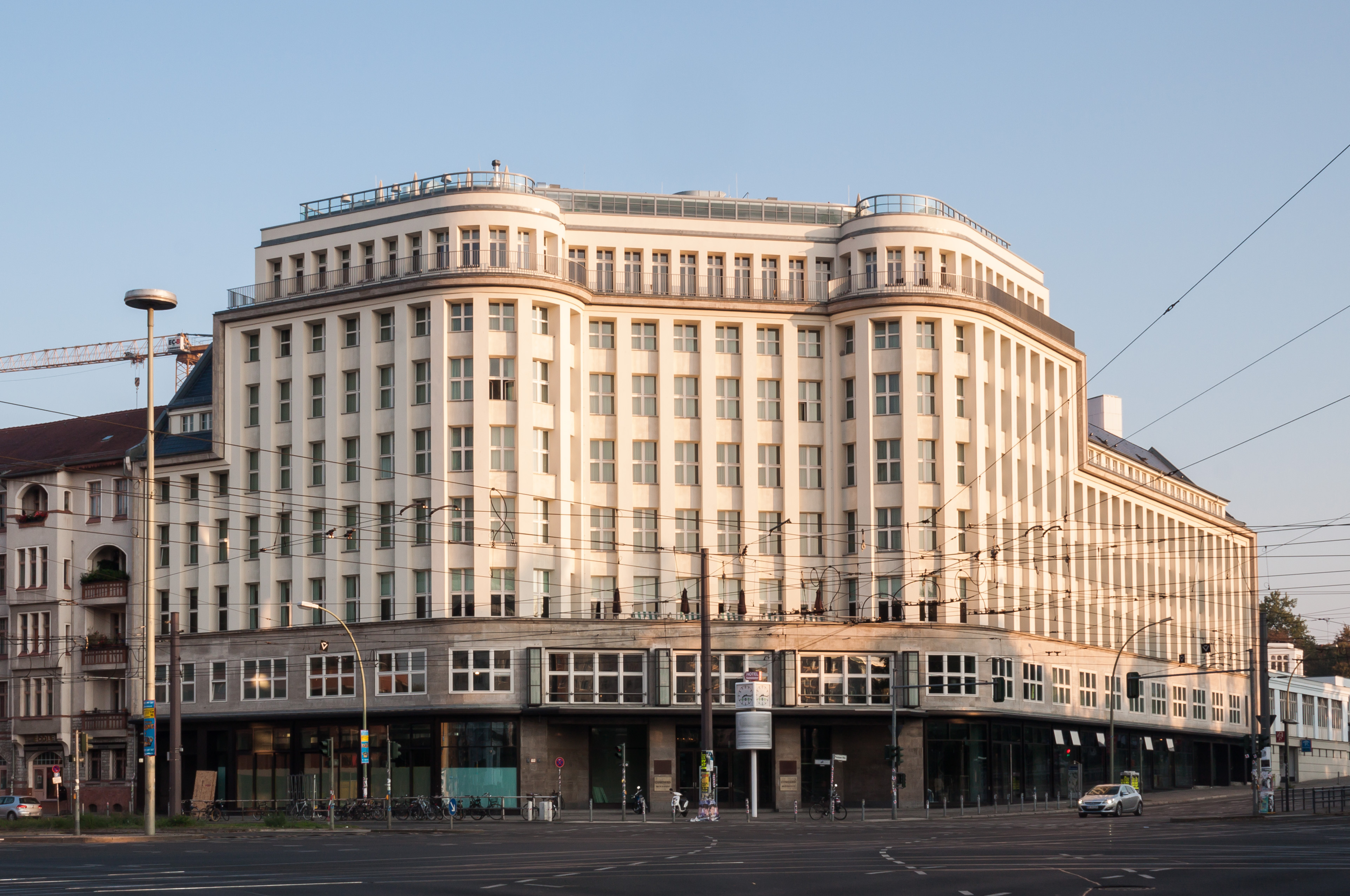
The former Kaufhaus Jonaß.

As the SED's central academic library, from 1950 onwards it worked on a central catalogue of literature on the history of social and of the workers movement - at the time of an exhibition at the Museum for German History on that topic from 15 February to 19 March 1989 the IML's catalogued holdings were estimated at 400,000 books and about 70,000 volumes of newspapers and magazines. Initially based at 30/31 Friedrich-Ebert-Straße in the former palace of the president of the Reichstag (opposite the Reichstag building), it moved into the Kaufhaus Jonaß at 1 Torstraße in Prenzlauer Berg in 1959 and remained there for the rest of its existence.

From 1969 onwards it was the leading research institution on the thought of Karl Marx and Friedrich Engels and on the history of the German Democratic Republic. For this purpose it housed the Scientific Council for Marx-Engels Research under Heinrich Gemkow and the Council for Historical Study of the GDR under Ernst Diehl. A five-year Central Research Plan for Social Sciences in the GDR (similar to five year plans for agriculture and industry) was used as the basis for yearly plans for the IML.

In the late 1960s it and its Moscow equivalent began the second attempt at compiling a historical-critical edition of the complete works, speeches and manuscripts of Marx and Engels, sometimes known in German as MEGA^{2} (from the acronym for the Marx-Engels-Gesamtausgabe). The IML closed in January 1990, as did its successor the Institute for the History of the Workers Movement on 31 March 1992. The IML's archives were transferred to the Foundation for the Archives of the Parties and Mass Organisations of the DDR (German: Stiftung Archiv der Parteien und Massenorganisationen der DDR, or SAPMO) in 1993 and now form part of the German Federal Archives.

== Departments ==
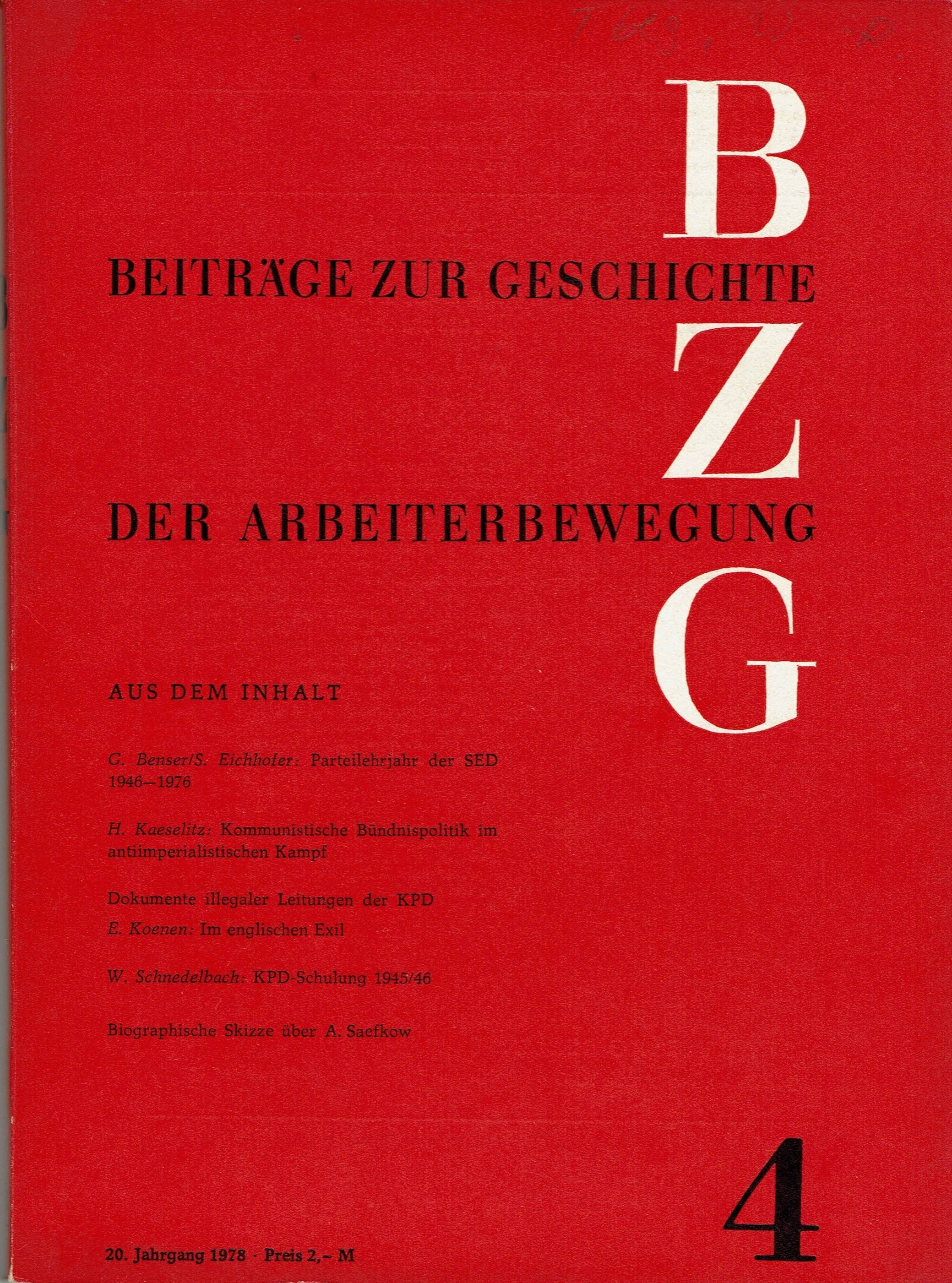
1978 issue of the periodical Beiträge zur Geschichte der Arbeiterbewegung.

- Marx-Engels (from 1953)
- Lenin (from 1951)
- Stalin (1949–1954)
- History of the German workers movements before 1945 (from 1953)
- History of the German workers movements from 1945 to the present (from 1969)
- History of the local workers movement and history of companies (from 1978)
- History of the international workers movement
- Scientific Study of Communism (from 1961)
- Editorial team for the journal "Beitrage zur Geschichte der Arbeiterbewegung" (from 1959)
- Central party archive (from 1963)
- Library (from 1949)

== Leadership ==
=== Directors ===
- Josef Winternitz (1949–1950)
- Bernhard Dohm (1951–1953)
- Anton Ackermann (1953)
- Ludwig Einicke (1953–1962)
- Roland Bauer (1962–1964)
- Lothar Berthold (1964–1968)
- Günter Heyden (1969–1989)
- Günter Benser (1989 – 1990/1992)

=== Heads of the library ===
- Bruno Kaiser (1946–1972)
- Jürgen Stroech (1972–1990)

=== Heads of the archives ===
- Heinz Voßke (1963–1990)

== Selected institute publications ==
=== Multi-volume ===
- J. W. Stalin: Werke. 13 volumes. Dietz Verlag, Berlin 1950–1955.
- Rosa Luxemburg: Ausgewählte Reden und Schriften. 2 volumes. Dietz Verlag, Berlin 1951.
- Walter Ulbricht: Zur Geschichte der Deutschen Arbeiterbewegung – Aus Reden und Aufsätzen. 7 volumes. Dietz Verlag 1952–1964.
- Wilhelm Pieck: Gesammelte Reden und Schriften. 6 volumes. Dietz Verlag, Berlin 1955–1981.
- Ernst Thälmann. Reden und Aufsätze zur Geschichte der deutschen Arbeiterbewegung. 2 volumes. Dietz Verlag, Berlin 1955–1956.
- W. I. Lenin: Werke. (German translation of the 4th Russian edition; 40 volumes, 2 supplementary volumes, register, comparative table of contents). Dietz-Verlag, Berlin 1956–1972.
- Marx-Engels-Werke. 39 volumes (in 43 books). Dietz Verlag 1956–1989.
- Karl Liebknecht: Gesammelte Reden und Schriften. 9 volumes. Dietz Verlag, Berlin 1958–1971.
- Geschichte der deutschen Arbeiterbewegung. 8 volumes. Dietz Verlag 1966.
- W. I. Lenin: Briefe. (German translation of the fifth Russian edition; 10 volumes). Dietz Verlag, Berlin 1967–1976.
- Rosa Luxemburg: Gesammelte Werke, 5 Bände. Dietz Verlag, Berlin 1970–1975.
- Der Bund der Kommunisten. Dokumente volumes Materialien. 3 volumes. Dietz Verlag, Berlin 1970–1984.
- Erich Honecker: Reden und Aufsätze. 12 volumes. Dietz Verlag, Berlin 1975–1988.
- August Bebel: Ausgewählte Reden und Schriften. Volumes 1, 2 and 6. Dietz Verlag, Berlin 1978–1983.

=== Illustrated ===
- Zur Geschichte der Kommunistischen Partei Deutschlands. Eine Auswahl von Materialien und Dokumenten aus den Jahren 1914 bis 1946. Dietz Verlag 1954.
- Ernst Thälmann, Bilder und Dokumente aus seinem Leben. Dietz Verlag, Berlin 1955.
- Illustrierte Geschichte der deutschen frühbürgerlichen Revolution. Dietz Verlag, 1974.
- Mit der Sowjetunion für immer fest verbunden. Eine Bilddokumentation. Dietz Verlag, Berlin 1974.
- Die Vereinigung von KPD und SPD zur SED in Bildern und Dokumenten. Dietz Verlag, Berlin 1976.
- Illustrierte Geschichte der Großen Sozialistischen Oktoberrevolution. Dietz Verlag 1977.
- Illustrierte Geschichte der deutschen Novemberrevolution 1918/1919. Dietz Verlag, Berlin 1978.
- Karl Marx und Friedrich Engels Ihr Leben und ihre Zeit. Dietz Verlag, Berlin 1978.
- Das Sozialistengesetz 1878–1890. Illustrierte Geschichte des Kampfes der Arbeiterklasse gegen das Ausnahmegesetz. Dietz Verlag 1980.
- Illustrierte Geschichte der Deutschen Demokratischen Republik. Dietz Verlag 1984.
- Tarnschriften der KPD aus dem antifaschistischen Widerstandskampf. Originalgetreue Reproduktion von 12 Heften aus den Jahren 1935/1936. Dietz Verlag, Berlin 1986.
- Illustrierte Geschichte der deutschen Revolution 1848/49. Dietz Verlag, Berlin 1988

== Bibliography (in German) ==
- Günter Benser: Aus per Treuhand-Bescheid. Der Überlebenskampf des Instituts für Geschichte der Arbeiterbewegung. edition bodoni, Berlin 2013, ISBN 978-3-940781-34-5
- Heinrich Gemkow: Vergessen wir die Alten nicht! Pioniere der ostdeutschen Marx-Engels-Edition. In: Beiträge zur Marx-Engels-Forschung. Neue Folge. Sonderband 5. Argument, Hamburg 2006, ISBN 978-3-88619-691-3, p. 271–282; (PDF).
- Rolf Hecker: Die Herausgabe von Marx/Engels-Schriften zwischen MEGA und MEW (1945–1953): In: Carl-Erich Vollgraf (Hrsg.): Die Marx-Engels-Werkausgaben in der UdSSR und DDR (1945–1968) (=Beiträge zur Marx-Engels-Forschung. Neue Folge. Sonderband 5). Argument, Hamburg 2006, ISBN 978-3-88619-691-3 (Inhaltsverzeichnis), p. 13–56.
- Siegfried Lokatis: Der rote Faden. Kommunistische Parteigeschichte und Zensur unter Walter Ulbricht. Böhlau, Köln, Weimar, Wien 2003, ISBN 978-3-412-04603-3. (PDF; 49,7 MB)
- Institut für Marxismus-Leninismus (ed.): Vierzig Jahre Institut für Marxismus-Leninismus beim ZK der SED. 1949–1989. Dietz Verlag, Berlin 1989.
