= Marguerite Kuczynski =

German economist and feminist (1904–1998)

- Born: Marguerite Steinfeld; 5 December 1904; Bischheim, Alsace-Lorraine, Germany
- Died: 15 January 1998 (aged 93); Berlin, Germany
- Political party: Communist Party of Germany; Socialist Unity Party
- Spouse: Jürgen Kuczynski (m. 1928; died 1997)
- Children: 3 (Thomas, Peter, Madeleine)

Academic background
- Education: Brookings Institution

Academic work
- Discipline: Economics, literary history, feminism
- School or tradition: Marxian economics
- Institutions: National Bureau of Economic Research; Institute for Marxism-Leninism for the Central Committee of the SED

Marguerite Kuczynski (née Steinfeld; 5 December 1904 – 15 January 1998) was a German economist and literary scholar. Some of her most productive and best documented years were spent in England, where she also achieved some notability as a feminist campaigner.

== Biography ==
Marguerite Steinfeld was born in 1904 in Bischheim, a small town just to the north of Strasbourg, and at that time part of the German Empire. When she was 14, the entire region was transferred to France following Germany's defeat in World War I. Steinfeld trained initially to work as a teacher. By 1920 she was studying at the Brookings Institution in Washington, D.C., where an early influence was the eminent statistician Ethelbert Stewart. While there, she got to know fellow German Jürgen Kuczynski, who was doing post-graduate work. They subsequently worked together and on 18 September 1928 they were married. In 1927 Steinfeld had taken a position as a research assistant at the recently established National Bureau of Economic Research, in New York City. In the summer of 1929, the young couple returned to Europe and settled in Berlin.

In January 1933 the Nazi Party took power and lost little time in setting up a one-party state in Germany. Membership of political parties (other than of the Nazi Party) became illegal, and the ban on political parties was enforced with particular effect in respect of (former) Communist Party of Germany members. During the next few years, the Nazi Party increasingly expressed the strident anti-Semitism which had been featured in Nazi rhetoric during that party's years in opposition. During 1933 the Nazis arrested and imprisoned many German communists; others left the country to avoid the same fate. Sources indicate that as early as February–March 1933, the Kuczynskis discussed following other family members into emigration, but at this point they decided to stay in Germany and participate in anti-fascist resistance. Eventually, in January 1936, emigration could be put off no longer, however, and the couple moved to England.

In England the two of them continued their work as left-wing economists while also engaging in anti-fascist activities, some of it legal: some not. Marguerite published a number of articles on the labour market, wages and the position of workers, sometimes in collaboration with her husband. She also participated in anti-fascist immigrant organisations and, later in the decade, established a library for the English branch of the Free German League of Culture in Great Britain (German: Freier Deutscher Kulturbund). She directed the library until the couple returned to Berlin in 1946. Up until 1942, she worked as secretary to the War Committee of German Woman Refugees (German: Kriegshilfskomitees deutscher Flüchtlingsfrauen). In 1943 she was elected to the executive committee of the Women's Co-operative Guild. She gave lectures on the theme of women's resistance in Nazi Germany, and contributed an essay to a compilation-publication entitled "Women under the Swastika". She also organised numerous support actions and assisted with the visa applications of German refugees persecuted for reasons of politics or race.

World War II ended in May 1945, with Berlin now at the heart of the Soviet occupation zone in what remained of Germany. Several months after her husband, Marguerite Kuczynski returned to Berlin in March 1947; the couple at first lived in the same house they had inhabited before the war. It was now considered within the city's US occupation zone. Kuczynski took a position with the city administration and then, as the de facto political division of the city began to appear more permanent, and a few years later to be reflected in physical frontier-divisions, she took work with the Finance Ministry in the Soviet zone. Later, the Soviet-administered occupation zone in East Germany was reorganized and declared in October 1949, as the Soviet-sponsored German Democratic Republic. At that time, Kuczynski began working for the East German Ministry of Foreign Trade (German: Außenwirtschaftsministerium). She gave up government work, however, contending that work there was "too amateurish" ("zu dilettantisch").

In any event, the real focus of power in East Germany, modelled on constitutional arrangements of the Soviet Union, was not with government ministries but with the Central Committee of the ruling Socialist Unity Party (German: Sozialistische Einheitspartei Deutschlands, abbreviated SED). From 1957 Kuczynski worked as an academic researcher with the Central Committee's Institute for Marxism-Leninism. In 1960 she retired from the Institute as well, finding it "too dogmatic". In the meantime, her outstanding achievements as a researcher with the Institute for Marxism–Leninism included a new edition of Karls Marx's early work, The Poverty of Philosophy, included in Volume 4 of the 43 volume Marx-Engels-Werke series produced by the SED Central Committee between 1956 and 1990. Her contribution to the new edition of The Poverty of Philosophy was much enhanced by her use of an early French language edition, discovered following intensive research in Japan, in which Marx himself had penned extensive margin notes.

== Selected works ==
- 1930: Der Fabrikarbeiter in der amerikanischen Wirtschaft
- 1930: Die Lage des deutschen Industrie-Arbeiters

Edition with translations of works by Quesnay (1965, 1971 and 1976) and Turgot (1981 and 1988).

Some of Marguerite Kuczynski's most enduring contributions to scholarship, produced only after her "retirement" in 1960, were a series of translations into German, supported by her own extensive and scholarly commentaries, of works by François Quesnay (Physiocrat). Later, during the 1980s, she made a start on a similar set of translations of the work of economist-statesman Turgot, but this project remained unfinished because her eyesight failed.

== Personal ==
The Kuczynskis had three children: Madeleine (1932), Peter (1937) and Thomas (1944). Of these, Thomas Kuczynski subsequently became notable as an economist and statistician, known in particular for his work on damages claims of forced labour under German rule during World War II. Rita Kuczynski, known in German-speaking lands as a writer-philosopher (and more recently as a novelist), is a daughter-in-law of Marguerite Kuczynski.

Marguerite Kuczynski died in Berlin in January 1998, slightly more than five months after the death of her husband. That year Thomas Kuczynski and his wife Rita divorced, following some years of separation.
