= Friends of the German People's Front in London =

The Committee of the Friends of the German People's Front in London (German: Freunde der deutschen Volksfront in London) was a London-based group of German anti-fascist exiles. In 1938 different German exile popular front friendship circles emerged in England, which in January 1939 merged into the Friends of the German People's Front with left-wing social democrat scholar Alfred Meusel as its chairman. Jürgen Kuczynski was one of the organizers of the group. Hans Mottek was a member of the group. The Friends of the German People's Front had its office at 139c Finchley Road.

The group published an English-language journal Germany Today (renamed Inside Nazi Germany in 1939), directed towards the British public. Inside Nazi Germany came to be co-published between the Friends of the German People's Front and Heinrich Mann's Committee of the German Opposition. The Friends of the German People's Front also issued a women's journal, Die Frau ('The Woman') in the first half of 1940. Both Inside Nazi Germany and Die Frau ceased publication mid-1940, in part due to internment of German exiles (Die Frau later re-emerged as Frau in Arbeit, then the organ for the Sudeten German Gemeinschaft berufstätiger Frauen).
