= Thomas Kuczynski =

German statistician and economist (1944–2023)

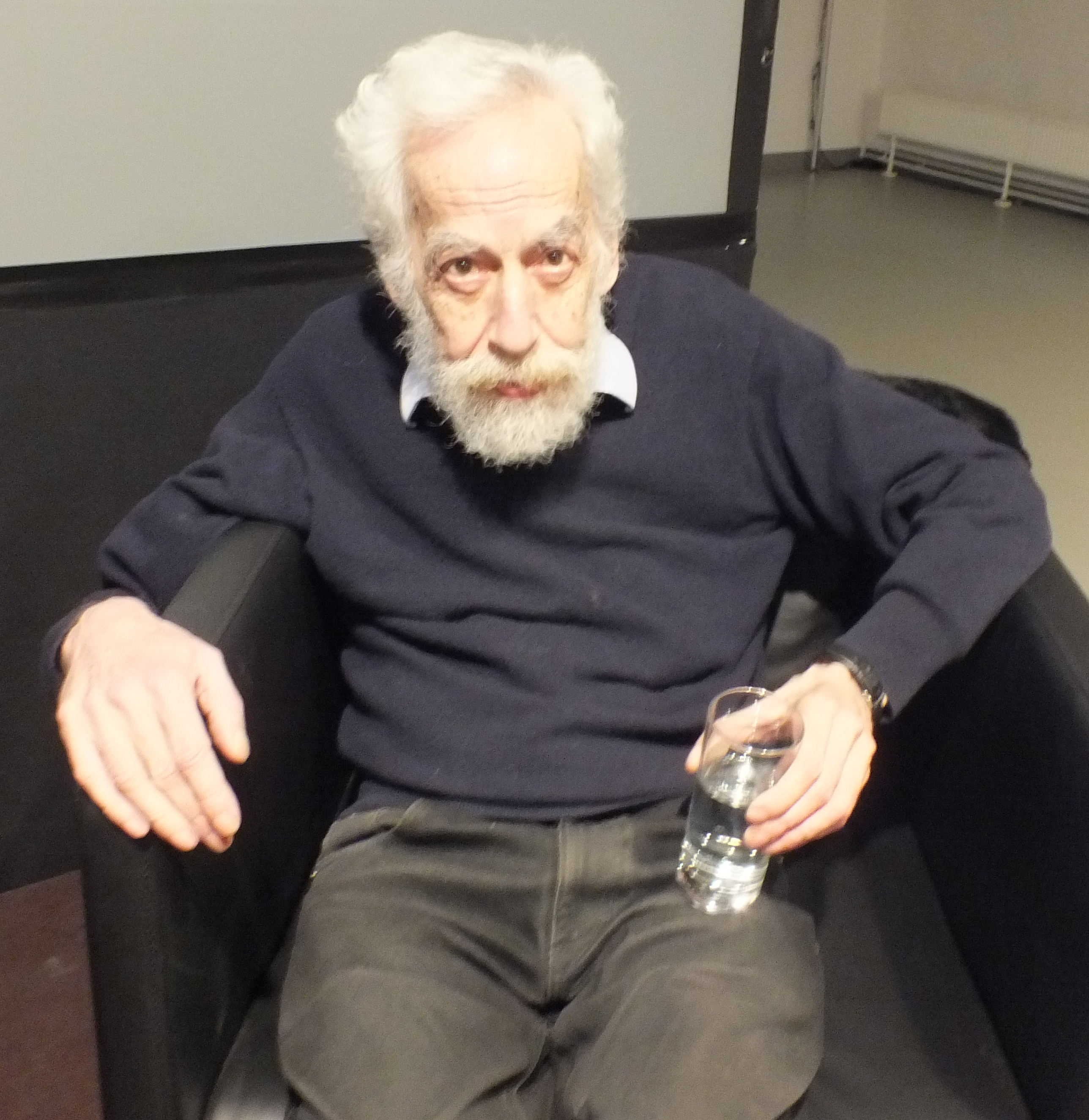
- Kuczynski in 2018
- Born: 12 November 1944; Hendon, London, England
- Died: 19 August 2023 (aged 78); Berlin, Germany
- Occupations: Economist; Statistician
- Spouse: Rita Kuczynski
- Parent(s): Jürgen Kuczynski; Marguerite Kuczynski (born Marguerite Steinfeld)

Thomas Kuczynski (12 November 1944 – 19 August 2023) was a German statistician and economist.

For reasons of politics and race Kuczynski was born in north-west London. Since 1947 he has lived in Berlin, however. Between 1988 and 1991 he served as the final director of the Institute for Economic History at the (East) German Academy of Sciences: the Institute had been established by his father in 1955.

== Life and career ==
Thomas Kuczynski was a member of a prominent family of Berlin intellectuals. His grandfather, Robert René Kuczynski, father, Jürgen Kuczynski and mother, Marguerite Kuczynski were all economists and/or statisticians. Thomas was born during the final year of the Second World War, and in 1945 the defeat of Nazi Germany opened the way for the family to return, in 1947, to Berlin, by now surrounded by the Soviet occupation zone in what remained of Germany. Kuczynski successfully completed his secondary schooling at the Paul-Österreich Upper School in 1963. Between 1963 and 1968 he attended the University of Applied Sciences for Engineering and Economics ("Hochschule für Technik und Wirtschaft") at Karlshorst in what had become known in the west as East Berlin: here he studied Statistics. Thomas Kuczynski received his doctorate in 1972 for work on the closing period in Germany of the Great Depression which for these purposes he placed at 1932–33. His dissertation was supervised by Hans Mottek.

A "left of centre" economist on his relationship with money:

"You know, money is so necessary, like visiting the toilet. You cannot survive in this world without money. But I do not myself find it worthwhile to sit on the toilet permanently"
"Ach, wissen Sie, Geld ist so notwendig, wie aufs Klo zu gehen. Ohne Geld ist in dieser Welt nicht zu überleben. Aber ich persönlich sehe es nicht als eine erstrebenswerte Tätigkeit an, ständig auf dem Klo zu sitzen."
Thomas Kuczynski, 2010

Between 1972 and 1991 Kuczynski worked as a research assistant / researcher at the Institute for Economic history at the German Academy of Sciences at Berlin, serving as its last director during the run up to the political changes that led to the Academy's dissolution (and partial resurrection as the Leibniz Society). Since 1991 he has emerged as a freelance academic and writer. In recent years Thomas Kuczynski's public profile has been raised with the publication of his study of compensation claims for forced labour victims of the Nazi years ("Entschädigungsansprüche für Zwangsarbeit im ‚Dritten Reich‘ auf der Basis der damals erzielten zusätzlichen Einnahmen und Gewinne"). Kuczynski concluded that the German Federal Republic should pay victims of forced labour under Nazi Germany approximately 180 Billion Deutsche Marks. Later, in his book "Brosamen vom Herrentisch", he increased his estimate to 228 Billion Deutsche Marks (equivalent to €116 Billion). In 2007 Kuczynski took part in the theatre project "Karl Marx: Das Kapital - Erster Band" ("Karl Marx: Das Kapital - First volume"), a show by Rimini Protokoll presenting a range of experts, mostly not normally to be found on a theatre stage, from various political and business backgrounds, giving their perspectives on Marxian philosophy in general and on Das Kapital in particular. Kuczynski claimed to eschew "-isms", but it is hard to avoid concluding that much of his academic work is undertaken through an appropriately updated Marxist prism. He was a member of the advisory council of the Bildungsgemeinschaft SALZ (Soziales, Arbeit, Leben & Zukunft), a left-of-centre think tank.

=== Personal life and death ===
Thomas Kuczynski was married to the writer-philosopher Rita Kuczynski between 1972 and 1998, though they separated in 1991.

Kuczynski died on 19 August 2023, at the age of 78.
