= Alfred Meusel =

German sociologist and historian

Alfred Meusel (19 May 1896 – 10 September 1960) was a German sociologist and historian.

== Biography ==
Alfred Meusel was born in to the family of a high-school teacher and received his secondary education in Kiel. He volunteered in the army with beginning of the World War, but soon distanced himself from the pro-war sentiment after being introduced to socialist ideas. In December 1917 he was badly injured and suffered from nervous disorders as a late consequence throughout his life.

From 1918 to 1922 he studied economics, sociology and history in Kiel. He received his doctorate in 1922 from Bernhard Harms with "Studies on the Object of Knowledge in Marx".

Meusel had joined the USPD in 1919 and later joined the SPD in 1922. In 1925 he left the SPD and approached the positions of the KPD without joining it until 1937. Together with Carl Max Maedge and Gertrud Savelsberg, he also belonged to the circle of friends and students around Ferdinand Tönnies, whom he knew from his time in Kiel. In 1922 he became a research assistant, in 1925 an associate professor, and in 1930 a full professor of economics and sociology at the RWTH Aachen University.

After the Nazi seizure of power and according to the Law for the Restoration of the Professional Civil Service, Meusel was forcibly dismissed from his position at the RWTH Aachen University for his political views and was taken in to protective custody for a short period.

In 1934 he emigrated with his wife via Denmark to Great Britain, where he pursued intensive sociological and historical studies. Among other things, he examined the situation of German emigrants in several countries. In 1937 he joined the exile organization of the KPD through his colleague Jürgen Kuczynski, was involved in the Freie Deutscher Kulturbund and from 1942 in the Freie Deutsche Hochschule in London set up by Arthur Liebert. In 1936, Meusel contributed to the joint work Studies on Authority and Family, initiated by Max Horkheimer, with a contribution on “The family in the German conception of society since 1933". In 1939, Meusel was elected chairman of the short-lived Friends of the German People's Front in London.

In 1946 he returned to Germany, specifically to Berlin, and became a member of the Socialist Unity Party. In 1947 he was a member of the First German People's Congress, later a member of the German People's Council. In 1947 he became a member of the Presidential Council of the German Cultural Association and a full professor of modern history at what later became the Humboldt University in Berlin. Being one of the few professors from the Weimar Republic who worked in the GDR, he was held in high esteem in East German universities and among SED politicians. In 1951 he was the founding director of the Institute for German History at Humboldt University, in 1952 also director of the Institute for the History of the German People there and the newly founded Museum for German History, which was merged into the German Historical Museum after reunification in 1990. In 1953 he was one of the co-founders of the Journal of Historical Science (ZfG).

From 1954 he was Vice President of the German Cultural Association. Meusel was a member of the Kulturbund parliamentary group from 1949 until his death in the Volkskammer of the GDR.

His urn was buried in the Berlin Friedrichsfelde Central Cemetery.

== Works ==
- Untersuchungen über das Erkenntnisobjekt bei Marx, Kiel 1922
- Die Abtrünnigen. In: „Kölner Vierteljahreshefte für Sozialwissenschaften“, Jg. 3, 1923, H. 2/3, S. 152–169
- List und Marx: Eine vergleichende Betrachtung, G. Fischer Verlag, Jena 1928
- Karl Marx. In: Fritz Karl Mann (Hrsg.), Gründer der Soziologie. Eine Vortragsreihe, Gustav Fischer, Jena 1932, S. 96–108 [= Sozialwissenschaftliche Bausteine, Bd. IV]
- National Socialism and the Family, The Sociological Review, 1936
- Thomas Müntzer und seine Zeit, Aufbau-Verlag, Berlin 1952
