= Museum for German History =

Central historical museum of East Germany

Coordinates: 52°31′05″N 13°23′49″E

The Museum for German History (Museum für Deutsche Geschichte or MfDG) was the central historical museum of the German Democratic Republic (GDR), established in 1952 and closed in 1990.

== History ==
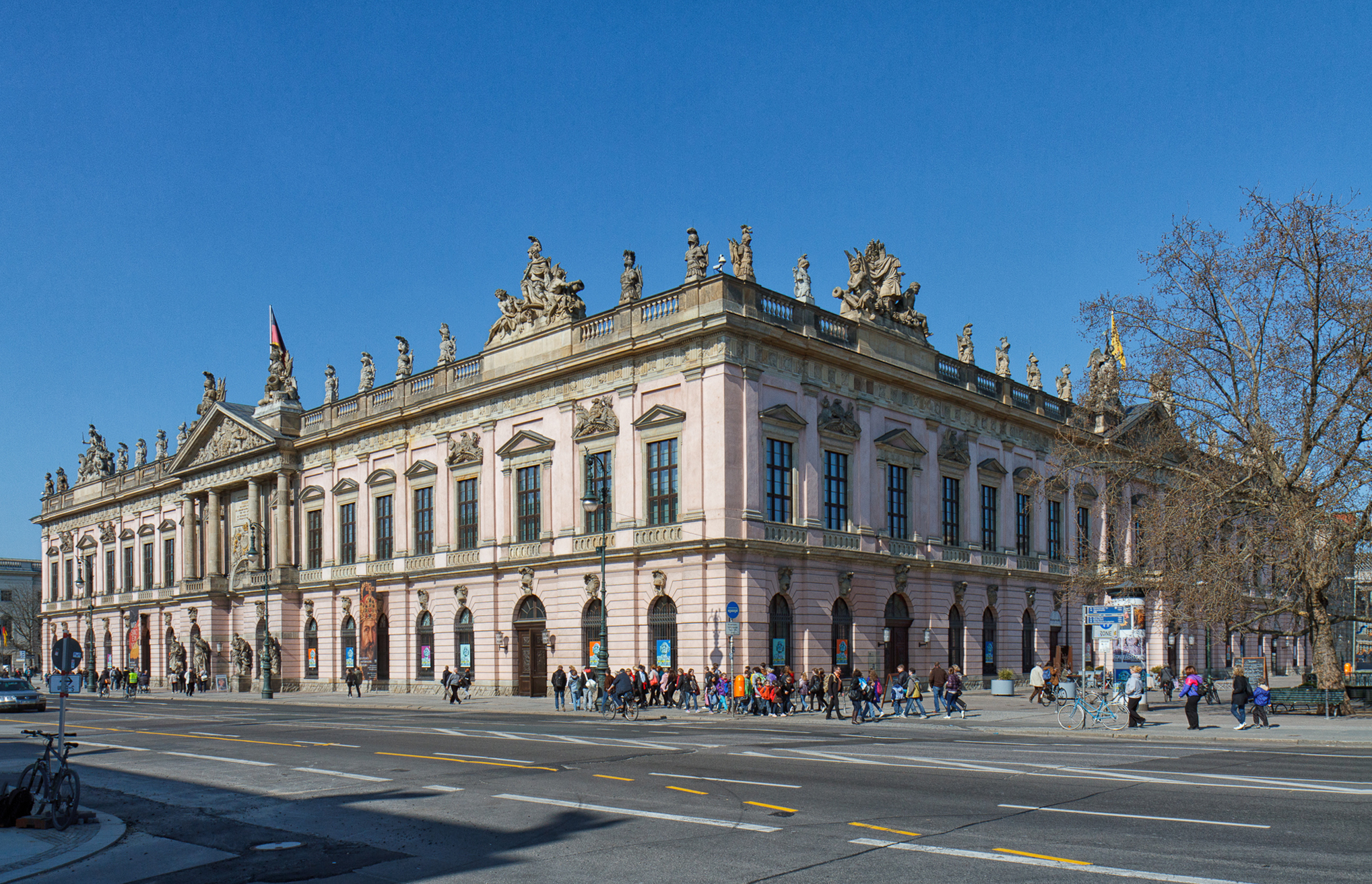
The Zeughaus

On 20 October 1951 the seventh plenary of the Central Committee of the Socialist Unity Party of Germany (SED) called for the establishment of a museum of German history "to enlighten the population and especially young people". The historian Eduard Ullmann, scientific secretary of the Institute for Marxism-Leninism for the Central Committee of the SED, came up with the initial plans for its objects and displays. All team heads, heads of department, directors and deputy directors were to belong to the SED, whilst an academic council ensured that the displays were always based on the Marxist-Leninist view of history.

The museum's first director was Alfred Meusel, with Ullmann as his deputy. The formal foundation was on 18 January 1952 in East Berlin and its first displays opened on 5 July that year in what had been a business school at 26 Clara-Zetkin-Straße, until the restoration of the museum's intended home, the Zeughaus, was sufficiently complete in March 1953. A team of 85 historians, curators and conservators created the initial permanent display under severe time pressure, only completing as far as 1848 by opening day and adding the rest by 1953.

Meusel was followed as director by Walter Nimtz (1963–1967) then Wolfgang Herbst (1967–1990). The GDR's Council of Ministers closed the museum in 1990 following the Peaceful Revolution. The new federal government of reunified Germany transferred the Zeughaus and the former museum's collections (including the objects it has loaned to the Velten Furnace and Ceramics Museum from 1970 to 1994) to the German Historical Museum.

== Displays ==
=== Permanent ===
The 1950s scheme was essentially retained throughout the museum's history. It was slightly adapted to the changing times in the 1960s but even after an early 1980s renovation (reworking "From Prehistory to Liberation from Fascism" in 1981 and the section on the GDR's history in 1984) its essential character remained unchanged.

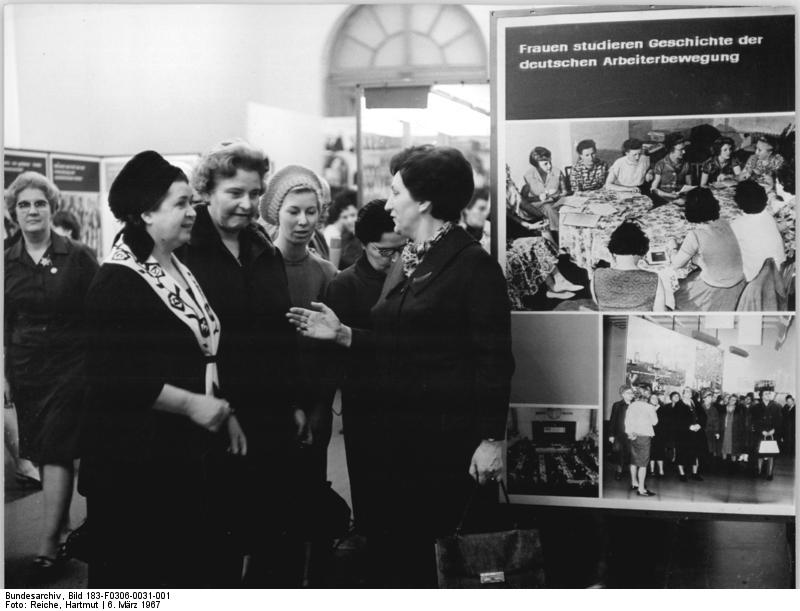
Exhibition marking the 20th anniversary of the Democratic Women's League of Germany

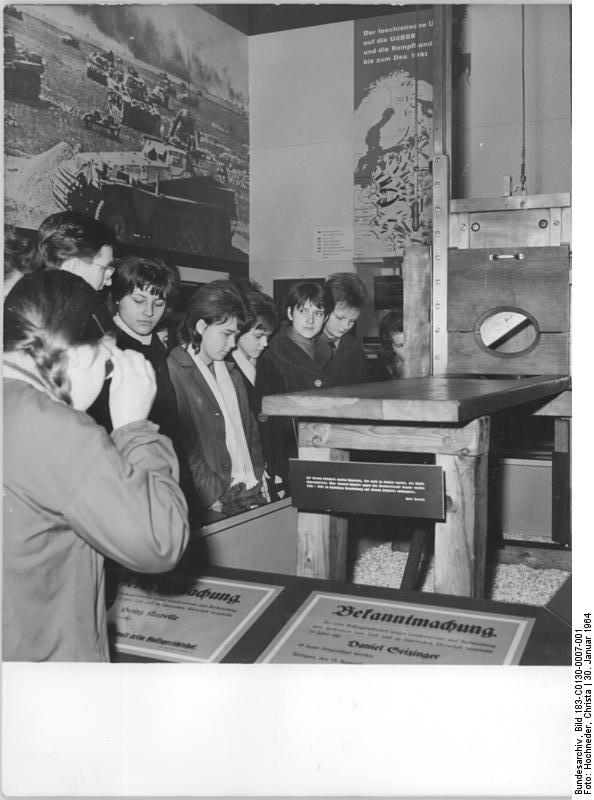
Youth hour at the Museum of German History during the exhibition “Germany from 1933–1945” in 1964

It interpreted German history as a class struggle consistent with Marx's historical materialism. It displayed texts and 100,000 objects, divided into seven departments, including:

- 'primitive history'
- feudalism
- 1789-1917
- 1917-1945
- 1945-present
- history of the German workers' movement

Essentially it portrayed the foundation of the GDR as a 'socialist republic' as the natural end-point for all German history, including that of the areas then in West Germany. It also included a memorial to Lenin to commemorate his stays in Berlin.

=== Temporary exhibitions ===
The museum also had changing temporary exhibitions, such as:

- 1953 - a large ones for the Karl Marx Year
- 1956 - "German Cities in the Middle Ages"
- 1959 - for the GDR's tenth anniversary
- 1973 - "Storm Year 1848"
- 1975 - for the anniversary of the German Peasants' War
- 1983 - "Martin Luther and His Time"

Others included "Weapons and Uniforms of History" to mark the return of confiscated weapons stocks by the Soviet Union or “V. I. Lenin and the German Workers' Movement”.

The GDR leadership intended the temporary exhibitions to have an even greater political impact than the museum's permanent displays. Until the 1970s they aimed to present progressive traditions in what was then West and East Germany but during the 1980s they became more internationalist, interpreting German history in the context of socialism's international development. The Luther exhibition in 1983 was significant in significant for the change in how history was presented in the GDR, including non-socialist aspects. Ninety-five special exhibitions had been designed by 1987, along with 107 touring exhibitions for abroad and 140 travelling exhibitions which toured the GDR and overseas.

== Bibliography ==
- (in German) Ilko-Sascha Kowalczuk: Legitimation eines neuen Staates. Parteiarbeiter an der historischen Front. Geschichtswissenschaft in der SBZ/DDR 1945–1961. Links, Berlin 1997, ISBN 3-86153-130-5, S. 175 ff.
- (in German) Stefan Ebenfeld: Geschichte nach Plan? Die Instrumentalisierung der Geschichtswissenschaft in der DDR am Beispiel des Museums für Deutsche Geschichte in Berlin (1950–1955). Tectum, Marburg 2001, ISBN 3-8288-8261-7.
- (in German) Museum für Deutsche Geschichte. In: Hartmut Zimmermann: DDR-Handbuch. Verlag Wissenschaft und Politik, Köln 1985, Bd. 2, S. 919.
- (in German) Ein neues Museum. In: Berlin-Kalender 1987, Hrsg. Luisenstädtischer Bildungsverein, 1997, ISBN 3-89542-089-1, S. 34–35.
- David E. Marshall: Das Museum für deutsche Geschichte – A Study of the Presentation of History in the Former German Democratic Republic (= Studies in Modern European History. Bd. 56). Peter Lang, New York 2010, ISBN 0-8204-7274-3.

== External links (in German) ==
- Offizielle Website des Deutschen Historischen Museums
- Das Museum für Deutsche Geschichte (Digitalisat vom Museumsführer, 3. Auflage, 1987)
- Ausgestellte Ideologie - Die Ausstellungen des Museums für Deutsche Geschichte 1952-1990. In: Kulturstiftung-des-Bundes.de
- Museum für Deutsche Geschichte – Nutzung ab 1952. In: DHM.de
- Postkartenbilder vom Museum für Deutsche Geschichte. In: DDR-Postkarten-Museum
- Rolf Lautenschläger: Geschichte restlos abgeräumt. In: Die Tageszeitung, 26. Mai 2009
