= Günter Benser =

German historian (1931–2025)

- Born: 12 January 1931; Heidenau, Saxony, Germany
- Died: 27 March 2025 (aged 94)
- Occupations: Historian (Marxist) and writer
- Political party: SED
- Children: 1

Günter Benser (12 January 1931 – 27 March 2025) was a German Marxist historian. Before 1989, he was a senior staff member of the Berlin-based Marxism–Leninism Institute attached to the ruling Socialist Unity Party of (East) Germany, and serving as its director for not quite two and a half eventful years, starting on 21 December 1989.

== Life and career ==
Benser was born into a working-class family in Heidenau, a small manufacturing town which he himself (in 2015) described as a "product of the rapid industrialisation of Saxony during the nineteenth and twentieth centuries". While he was growing up amateur dramatics and the "Heidenauer Volksbühne" (theatre), which his grandfather had co-founded in 1906, played an important part in the Bensers' family life. He embarked on a management traineeship with Elbtalwerke AG, a local manufacturer, and then began to study history at Leipzig University.

He was employed in 1952/53 by the district council in Leipzig. Between 1955 and 1989, he was also employed as a researcher, latterly as a deputy head of department, at the SED's Berlin based Marxism–Leninism Institute. He was also a member of the Council for Historical Studies ("Rat für Geschichtswissenschaft") and worked for the National Historians' Committee of the German Democratic Republic (East Germany). He received his doctorate from the Marxism–Leninism Institute in 1964 for a dissertation on the Strategy and Tactics of the Marxist German workers' political parties between 1945 and 1949.

The Marxism–Leninism Institute in Berlin where Benser worked for more than three decades was tightly regulated till 1971, a period during which according to at least one source Walter Ulbricht, the country's leader, appeared to see himself as the nation's top historian. Ulbricht's successor, Erich Honecker, took a less hands-on approach to national history, and researchers at the Institute were able to discuss their subject more openly, even though a principal role of the Institute continued to involve de facto censorship of published history to ensure compliance with party doctrine. In this context, following the breach of the Berlin Wall which took place in November 1989 and the flood of high-level resignations that ensued, the Institute found itself leaderless. On 21 December 1989, Günter Benser found himself elected director of the institute by his fellow members, with 298 votes in support, 14 abstentions and one vote against his election, and he duly took over the directorship vacated, after a twenty-year incumbency, by Günter Heyden. Twenty-five years later, Benser was still recalling in print his surprise over this turn of events. He retained the directorship until March 1992 when the Institute dissolved itself.

Benser was an honorary member of the Rosa Luxemburg Foundation. On 27 March 2025, Benser died at the age of 94.

== Awards and honours ==
- 1966: Patriotic Order of Merit
- 1978: National Prize of East Germany

== Output ==
During the forty-year existence of the German Democratic Republic Benser published numerous articles and compilations concerned with the history of the country's ruling Socialist Unity Party of Germany (Sozialistische Einheitspartei Deutschlands / SED) and of communism more generally. His pre-1989 works were part of East Germany's standard historiography of itself and effectively followed the established party line. After 1989 he distanced himself from his earlier output, and after 1993 he joined other former doyens of the East German academic and intellectual establishment as a member of the Leibniz Society of Sciences.

As well as his writings on politics and party matters, Benser chronicled the history of the "Heidenauer Volksbühne" (theatre).
