= Günter Heyden =

German academic (1921–2002)

Günter Heyden (16 February 1921 – 21 January 2002) was a German professor of philosophy and a sociologist. Between 1969 and 1989 he was the director of the East Berlin-based Institute for Marxism–Leninism.

== Biography ==
Günter Heyden was born in Stargard, a small industrial town and railway junction a short distance to the east of Stettin. His father was a qualified oven engineer. After leaving school he trained for and entered his father's profession. In 1941 he was conscripted for military service. In March 1945 he was captured by the Americans and then transferred to the Soviets, spending the nearly five years, till December 1949, as a prisoner of war. During his final six months of detention, between July and December 1949, he benefitted from a period of political education at a Soviet Antifascist Academy.

He returned early in 1950 to what had recently, in October 1949, been relaunched as the German Democratic Republic (East Germany), a separated Soviet sponsored German state with political and socio-economic structures consciously modelled on those of the Soviet Union itself. He promptly joined the new nation's ruling Socialist Unity Party ("Sozialistische Einheitspartei Deutschlands" / SED). In 1950/51 he taught at the Trades Union Federation Academy in Beesenstedt, latterly serving as the institution's deputy head. Between 1952 and 1956 he studied at the Party Central Committee's prestigious Institute for Social Sciences ("Institut für Gesellschaftswissenschaften beim ZK der SED" / IfG) - as it was known at that time - emerging with a doctorate. He remained at the institute, now with a succession of teaching posts, for another decade. Between 1957 and 1964, and again between 1966 and 1969, he held the top teaching chair for Marxist–Leninist philosophy. In 1962 he was appointed Professor of historical materialism at the institute. From 1964 till 1966 he was also deputy director of the Party Central Committee's Institute for Opinion Research, also serving during this period as a member of the Politburo's Agitprop Commission.

From 1964 till 1968 Heyden headed up the Philosophy department at the (East) German Academy of Sciences. In 1969 he was given a full professorship at the Berlin Institute for Marxism–Leninism, where he served as director, in succession to Lothar Berthold, till 1989. He also led the editorial commission for the Marx-Engels-Gesamtausgabe (MEGA) on the German side.

Between 1956 and 1987 he was a member of the editorial college of the "German Philosophy Journal" (der "Deutschen Zeitschrift für Philosophie"), and from 1976 till 1989 he was in addition a member of the editorial college of the SED newspaper, "Einheit" ("Unity"). Between 1981 and 1989 he was also a member of the national audit commission ("Zentrale Revisionskommission").

Heyden died in Berlin on 21 January 2002 at the age of 80.

== Awards and honours ==
- 1968 Patriotic Order of Merit in silver
- 1981 National Prize of the German Democratic Republic
- 1981 Patriotic Order of Merit in gold
- 1986 Order of Karl Marx
