= Rita Kuczynski =

German author, philosopher and editorialist

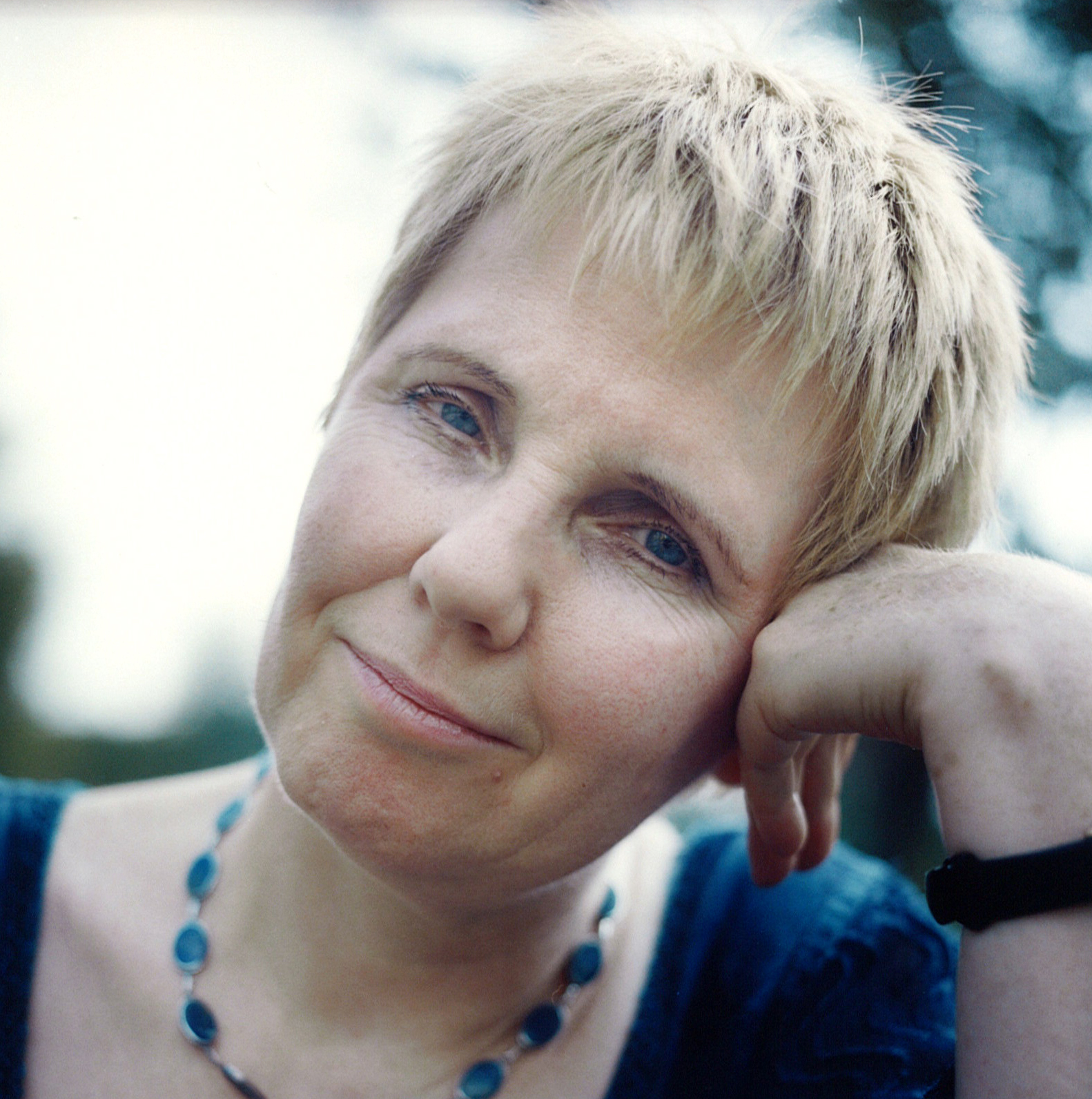
Kuczynski in 2003

Rita Kuczynski (born 25 February 1944) is a German author, philosopher and editorialist.

== Early life ==
Rita Kuczynski was born in Neidenburg, Masuren. She grew up in East and West Berlin and studied music (piano and organ) from 1956 to 1962. She undertook a master's in piano at the Saint Petersburg Conservatory. From 1965 to 1970, she studied philosophy at the University of Leipzig and the University of Berlin.

== Career ==
In 1971, Kuczynski became an assistant at the Institute for Philosophy in the German Academy of Sciences at Berlin. From 1981 until 1990, she worked as a freelance writer.

In 1987, she became visiting professor for philosophy and literature at the University of Buffalo. She delivered lectures and papers at Columbia University, the University of Minnesota, and the University of Maryland, as well as the German Studies Association. After the upheavals of 1989, she separated from her husband. They were divorced in 1998.

In 1991, she served as visiting professor for languages at the University of Chile. During work on a monograph about Gabriela Mistral she undertook research trips to Santiago de Chile, Concepción, La Serena, Vicuña and Montegrande.

Since 1998, she has worked as an independent journalist and editorialist for the Süddeutsche Zeitung, the Frankfurter Allgemeine Zeitung, Die Zeit, the Tagesspiegel, the Berliner Zeitung, DeutschlandRadio Berlin and Radio Bremen.

Her contributions to the discussion of German Reunification focus on the mutual understanding of East and West. She participated in the general discussion after reunification as a moderator in the DeutschlandRadio Berlin radio series Tacheles, in the Berlin Runde and in political features on DeutschlandRadio. She has participated in several television debates and talk shows on Germany unity.

== Personal life ==
In 1972, she married Thomas Kuczynski. She received the Promotion A from the Academy in 1975, with a doctorate on Hegel.

== Works ==
=== Fiction ===
- 1984 – Nächte mit Hegel (Nights with Hegel). Lizenznummer 48-48/10/84.
- 1991 – Wenn ich kein Vogel wär (If I were not a Bird). ISBN 3-612-27057-5.
- 1997 – staccato. ISBN 3-612-65013-0.
- 1999 – Mauerblume (Wallflower). ISBN 3-546-00189-3.
- 2001 – Die gefundene Frau (The Discovered Woman). ISBN 3546-00308-X.
- 2010 – Im Kreis (In the Circle). ISBN 978-3-86931-411-2.
- 2014 – Aber der Himmel war höher (But the Sky was Higher). ISBN 978-3-8442-9267-1 (E-Book)

=== Non-fiction ===
- 1999 – DDR – Ende mit Wende (GDR: End with Change); with Stefan Moses, Harald Eggebrecht; ISBN 3-7757-9005-5.
- 2002 – Die Rache der Ostdeutschen (The Revenge of East Germany); ISBN 3-932529-37-5.
- 2003 – Im Westen was Neues – Ostdeutsche auf dem Weg in die Normalität (Something New in the West: East Germans on the way to normality); ISBN 3-932529-91-X.
- 2005 – Ostdeutschland war nie etwas Natürliches – Deutschlandkenner aus Mittel- und Osteuropa, Frankreich, Großbritannien und den USA über das vereinte Deutschland (East Germany was Never Something Natural: German experts of Central and Eastern Europe, France, Great Britain and the USA on the Divided Germany); ISBN 3-8660-1440-6.
- 2013 – Was glaubst du eigentlich? Weltsicht ohne Religion (What do you actually believe in? World-view without religion); ISBN 978-3-86153-743-4.

=== Radio features ===
- Lacrimosa 1953 by Rita Kuczynski (37’) Radio-play: DS Kultur, 1988.
- Maria oder Eine namenlose Geschichte (Maria, or A Nameless History). Director: Günter Bormann. Producer: Rundfunk der DDR, 1984.
- Was ist ein Berg? (What is a Mountain?). Literary feature about Chilean poet Gabriela Mistral. Director: Horst Liepach. Producer: DS Kultur, 1991.

=== Film ===
- Between Pankow and Zehlendorf. Adaptation of Rita Kuczynski's novel, Wenn ich kein Vogel wär, 1991. Regie: Horst Seemann, Drehbuch: Rita Kuczynski/Horst Seemann

=== Essays ===
- "Sich nicht zur Unzeit begegnen – Ein Feature" (We do not meet at the wrong time: A Feature). in Surviving the twentieth century; Social Philosophy from the Frankfurter School to the Columbia Faculty Seminars. Judith T. Marus editor Transaction Publishers. New Brunswick (USA) and London (U.K.), 1999, ISBN 1-56000-352-9, pp. 295–311
- "Von der Stärke schwacher Bindungen – Essay – (Über die Zukunft menschlicher Beziehungen am Ende des Industriezeitalters in Europa.)" (Weak Ties of the Strong: Essay (About the Future of Human Connections at the End of the Industrial Age in Europe). in Antoinette – Tarot der Europa; 1999, ISBN 3-932529-68-5, S-50-55.
- "Der Einstieg in den Ausstieg" (The Entrance to the Exit). in Wolf Biermann et al., Die Ausbürgerung. Anfang vom Ende der DDR. Fritz Pleitgen (ed.). Ullstein, Berlin 2001, ISBN 3-89834-044-9, S. 148–151.

== Awards ==
- Writers' Grant from the Senate of Berlin (1993)
- Scholarship of the Stiftung Kulturfonds der neuen Bundesländer (1994)
- Scholarship of the Berliner Künstlerförderung (1995)
- Scholarship of the Council for European Studies (1995)
- Scholarship of the University of Buffalo, Department for History and Department for Modern Languages and Literature (1995)
- Literary scholarship of the Stiftung Preußische Seehandlung (1998)
- Writer at Johns Hopkins University, The American Institute for Contemporary German Studies, Washington D.C. (2001)
- Literary award from China Time, Republic of China (2002)
- Senior Fellow at the American Institute for Contemporary German Studies (2008)
