= Jürgen Kuczynski =

German economist and economic historian (1904–1997)

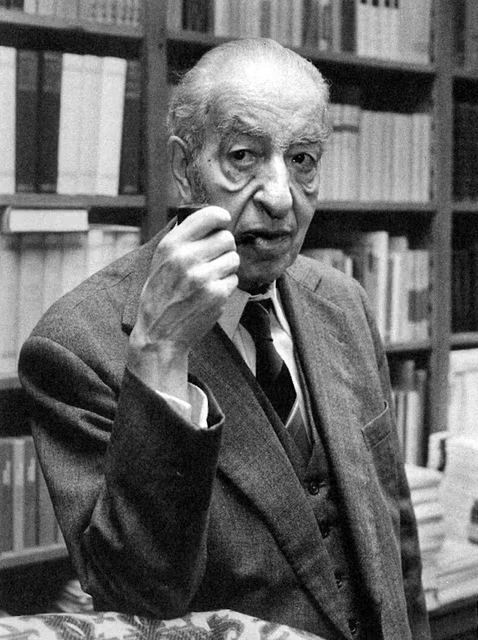
- Born: 17 August 1904; Elberfeld, Wuppertal, Prussia, Germany
- Died: 6 August 1997 (aged 92); Berlin, Germany
- Political party: Communist Party of Germany; Socialist Unity Party; Party of Democratic Socialism
- Spouse: Marguerite Steinfeld (m. 1928)
- Children: 3 (Thomas, Peter, Madeleine)
- Parent: Robert René Kuczynski
- Relatives: Ursula Kuczynski (sister)

Academic background
- Education: University of Erlangen-Nuremberg; Humboldt University of Berlin; Heidelberg University; Brookings Institution

Academic work
- Discipline: Economics, economic history
- School or tradition: Marxian economics
- Institutions: Humboldt University of Berlin, German Academy of Sciences at Berlin

Member of the Volkskammer
- In office 1949–1958

Military service
- Allegiance: United States
- Branch/service: United States Army Air Forces
- Rank: Lieutenant colonel
- Battles/wars: World War II; German resistance to Nazism; Strategic bombing during World War II

Jürgen Kuczynski (German pronunciation: [ˈjʏʁɡn̩ kuˈtʃɪnskiː]; 17 September 1904 – 6 August 1997) was a German economist, journalist, and communist activist. He also provided intelligence to the Soviet Union during World War II.

By 1936, Kuczynski had followed his father and other family into exile in England. After being temporarily interned as an enemy alien at the start of World War II, during the war he was recruited by the Office of Strategic Services, the precursor of the Central Intelligence Agency, to recruit German communists to be sent to Germany to make contact with resistance groups. He also served in the US Army as a colonel in its Air Force, on a team conducting the Strategic Bombing Survey. At the same time he passed their results "to Soviet intelligence." In 1942 he recruited Klaus Fuchs to Soviet intelligence and introduced the physicist to his sister Ursula Kuczynski (aka Ruth Werner), who had become a "star agent" of the Soviet Union. She acted as Fuchs's courier for four years, but as far as is known she was never placed under surveillance by MI5, and was not prevented from leaving England in 1950 shortly before Fuchs went on trial.

After the war, Kuczynski initially returned to Germany on assignment with the US Army, first serving in the American zone of what became West Germany. Appointed to an academic position by the Soviet authorities, he settled in East Germany. He joined the "Communist-dominated Socialist Unity Party of Germany (SED)", which directed him to work in academic and cultural affairs. He became one of East Germany's leading intellectuals after the war, maintaining his Marxist faith and communist affiliations. He wrote prolifically and is credited with nearly 4,000 titles.

== Early life ==
Born in 1904 in Elberfeld, a subdivision of Wuppertal, Jürgen Kuczynski was the eldest of the six recorded children born into a Jewish family headed by economist and demographer Robert René Kuczynski and his wife, painter Berta Kuczynski (née Gradenwitz). (The Independent described his father as a banker.) The children were gifted, and the family was prosperous.

Jürgen's sister Ursula, also known as Ruth Werner, became a spy who worked for the Soviet Union in the 1930s and 1940s.

The family lived in a small villa in the Schlachtensee quarter in the south-west of Berlin. Growing up in a family of left-wing academics, as an adolescent Jürgen Kuczynski met numerous scholars and activists, including communist leaders Karl Liebknecht and Rosa Luxemburg. Kuczynski was deeply influenced by the bildungsbürgerlich values, an untranslatable German term for the values of the German upper middle class (Bildungsbürgertum) that emphasized cultivating a cultured, humanist outlook on life together with a love of nature and aestheticism.

== Education ==
Between 1910 and 1916 Kuczynski attended a private school in Berlin-Zehlendorf, before progressing to an academic secondary school in the city. He completed his schooling in 1922 and went on to study at Erlangen, Berlin and Heidelberg. His subjects included philosophy, statistics and political economy. German universities were strongholds of the Völkisch movement, and though Kuczynski was a secular Jew, he discovered during his time at Erlangen University that he was not welcome as most of the faculty and the students made it very clear that to them he was just a Jew. Kuczynski was advised not to eat in the student cafeteria and in his diary in 1924 he wrote he felt very keenly of "being Jewish in racial terms", going on to write: "I think I'm the only 'stranger', meaning Jew in town. People turn their heads when they see me walking in the streets". Kuczynski often noted that, though he refused to identify with Judaism as a religion, his "Jewish appearance" as he called it — as he had facial features commonly associated with people of Middle Eastern descent — led others to automatically assume that he was Jewish. In a letter to his parents in 1925, he wrote, "it is virtually impossible to go into a café here without being verbally abused by anti-Semites." In common with many other Jewish intellectuals at the time, Kuczynski grew interested in Marxism with its promise of an utopian society where there would be no more nationalism or religion, and hence the entire Jewish question would be rendered moot. From 1925 onward, he started to read various Marxist tracts. In April 1925, during a visit to Paris, he took part in a demonstration organised by the French Communist Party against the Rif War, which was fired upon by the Paris police, an incident that increased his sympathy with communism. Despite the incident, Kuczynski wrote that no other city in the world "has the magic, the vitality of Paris". In Paris, Kuczynski met the satirist Kurt Tucholsky. Tucholsky, like Kuczynski, longed for a world without the Jewish question, and believed that Marxism, which promised to dissolve all forms of national identify in favor of class struggle, offered the opportunity for that world.

Despite his communist sympathies, in October 1925 Kuczynski went to work at the Bett, Simon & Company bank as an intern, where he did well and was rapidly promoted up the corporate ranks. Kuczynski was soon donating some of his pay earned at the bank to the Communist Party of Germany (German: Kommunistische Partei Deutschlands, abbreviated KPD), the irony of which did not escape him. In 1926, he published his first book and began to contribute articles to the journal Finanzpolitische Korrespondenz where his left-wing views were readily apparent. Through his parents, he became active in the League for Human Rights, a front organisation for the KPD run by Willi Münzenberg who soon became a major intellectual influence on the younger Kuczynski. Besides Münzenberg, Kuczynski met other prominent people who were members of the League such as Albert Einstein, Ludwig Quidde, and Carl Mertens. At a showing of the 1925 Soviet film Battleship Potemkin, Kuczynski met the Soviet cultural minister Anatoly Lunacharsky and the economist Yevgeny Varga, who became one of Kuczynski's closest friends.

In 1926 he traveled to the United States as a research student, undertaking post-graduate studies at the Brookings Institution in Washington, DC. He followed this with work leading the economic department of the American Federation of Labor until 1929, gaining practical experience. In 1927, his father visited the Soviet Union and was astonished to be asked if he was in any way related to the J. Kuczynski who had written the "excellent" articles on the problems of modern capitalism in the Finanzpolitische Korrespondenz. In the same letter, the older Kuczynski advised his son to start learning Russian because what he had seen in the Soviet Union had left him convinced that "Soviet Russia is the future".

== Journalism and communism ==
Kuczynski returned to Germany in 1929 and settled in Berlin. In 1930 he joined the KPD. Between 1930 and 1933 he contributed to the party newspaper, Die Rote Fahne, in its information department and as its economics editor, joining the editorial board in 1931. Kuczynski wrote extensively, and he shared the economic analyses that he produced for the newspaper with the Soviet ambassador. The German scholar Axel Fair-Schulze argued that bildungsbürgerlich values he grew up with "...inoculated Kuczynski against becoming a die-hard Stalinist, despite being politically in tune with the Stalinist line...While he was a faithful Stalinist on the surface, Kuczynski almost instinctively refused to become a mere party soldier".

In January 1933 the Nazi Party took power and quickly set up a one-party state in Germany. Membership of political parties (other than of the Nazi Party) became illegal, and the ban on political parties was enforced with particular effect in respect of (former) Communist Party members. During the next few years, the government increasingly adopted anti-Semitic policies.

During 1933 many German communists were arrested and imprisoned, while many others left the country to avoid the same fate. Sources indicate that as early as February/March 1933 Kuczynski and his wife discussed following his parents and four of Jürgen's five sisters in emigrating to Britain, but they decided to stay in Germany and participate in anti-fascist resistance. During the next three years, their work became increasingly illegal as the government's anti-democratic agenda was enacted.

Kuczynski continued to provide analytical work on economic and social developments in Germany for the benefit of Communist Party national leaderships. These were made available to Soviet institutions, used in Soviet newspapers, and employed in propaganda. He was also active in the Revolutionäre Gewerkschafts Opposition (Revolutionary Union Opposition) movement until it was completely suppressed in 1935. The risk to Kuczynski of being arrested and having his home ransacked by government agencies was pressing and constant. During this period he also traveled to Moscow in 1935. Finally, in January 1936, emigration could be put off no longer and he moved to Britain, joining his father. Recent scholarship confirms that the timing of his move to London was triggered by instructions received from Moscow. In 1936, Kuczynski started to work as a spy for Soviet military intelligence, the Main Intelligence Directorate (Russian: Главное разведывательное управление, romanised: Glavnoye razvedyvatel'noye upravleniye, abbreviated GRU).

== English exile ==
=== Publications ===
Within Britain his contribution to left wing politics included work on the magazine Labour Monthly, an organ of the Moscow-oriented Communist Party of Great Britain. His international academic reputation gained him access to British establishment figures including, according to one source, Winston Churchill, who became prime minister during the war. Kuczynski became a natural leader for the German communists who had sought refuge in the UK from Nazism. He maintained regular contacts with the exiled KPD leadership which, during the second half of the 1930s, was based in Paris; he met with them there to exchange ideas. Kuczynski who was fluent in English handled relations between the KPD exiles in Britain and the CPGB.

In the spring of 1939, he published in London The Condition of the Workers in Great Britain, Germany and the Soviet Union, 1932-1938, a comparative study of the working classes in the three nations written from a Marxist perspective. The book was divided into sections, the first of which compared Britain to the Germany as he called both "finance capital countries" with Britain "is ruled by finance capitalism as a whole and by democratic methods" while Germany "is ruled by the most reactionary section of finance capitalism, the heavy industries, the armament industries and by dictorial methods". Kuczynski argued based upon a detailed economic study that productivity for the average worker in Britain rose by 20% between 1932-1937 and in Germany worker productivity rose by 11% in the same period, which he attributed to the fact that many British workers belonged to unions that fought for better treatment while German workers had only the Nazi pseudo-union, the German Labour Front, that represented the interests of management.

The second section of the book was concerned with life in the Soviet Union. Kuczynski took a defensive tone when writing about the Soviet working class, arguing that the legacy of Imperial Russia had left the country backward and underdeveloped, but he still argued: "...until the Soviets came to power, it was only a small minority of the whole population had shoes-today, the vast majority of Soviet workers have shoes, but the demand for shoes is increasing so rapidly that up to now, Soviet industry has not been able to meet it fully". Kuczynski admitted that life for most people in the Soviet Union was more backward than in the west, but claimed "the Soviet Union has been heavily burdened with the crimes of Czarism and in many respect it is just reaching the Western capitalist standard. But it does not alter the fact that the Soviet Union is not only rapidly reaching, but will soon pass the Western capitalist standard". Reflecting his bildungsbürgerlich background of the Bildungsbürgertum which emphasized the value of culture as a way of improving one's character, Kuczynski looked at cultural and intellectual life of the working classes. In this regard, Kuczynski made much of the fact that between 1917 and 1936 more copies of the novels of Charles Dickens and Victor Hugo had been published in the Soviet Union than in Great Britain by a factor of about 1 million books, which he used to argue that life for the Soviet working class was improving. Reflecting his interest in culture, Kuczynski made much of the publications of the classics of Russian literature, quoting statistics showing that since 1917 32 million copies of the works of Maxim Gorky had been published, 19 million copies of the work of Alexander Pushkin, 14 million copies of the work of Count Leo Tolstoy, and 11 million copies of the work of Anton Chekhov. Noting the fact that theater and cinema tickets were sold cheaply in the Soviet Union, Kuczynski argued that "men do not live by bread alone. In no country in the whole world and, more specifically, in neither Great Britain nor in Germany is there so much spiritual food put at the disposal of the masses of the people of the USSR." Schulze-Fair noted that Kuzynski's bildungsbürgerlich values led him to characteristically assume that as long as works of high culture were available to the masses that must mean the lives of ordinary people were improving, making his book very naïve and dated as he completely ignored the suffering and violence of the first five-year-plan of 1928-1933 and the Yezhovshchina (Great Purge) of 1936–38.

=== Contacts with other internees, espionage ===
For Britain September 1939 marked the outbreak of the Second World War: Kuczynski was one of many German exiles interned as enemy aliens. Kuczynski was interned in January 1940 and released in March 1940. As internees were permitted to talk to one another, he continued his "anti-Fascist" work among his fellow internees. He was released sooner than most of the Germans caught up in this exercise, following high-level American intervention with the British authorities. At some stage during his time in England, Kuczynski was recruited by the US Intelligence Services as a statistician. He was also, like his eldest sister Ursula/Ruth, undertaking espionage assignments for the GRU.

Klaus Fuchs, a physicist from Leipzig, was another of the German communist exiles who had sought refuge in Britain. Arrested as an enemy alien at the start of the war, Fuchs was interned on the Isle of Man and then in Canada; he was allowed to return to Britain and was released in 1941. Kuczynski and Fuchs got to know one another, and the economist persuaded the physicist to work for the GRU. Fuchs had already been identified by Anthony Blunt, who had sifted through the MI5 security evaluations of people involved in the Tube Alloys project (the British atomic bomb program), as someone very likely to work for Soviet intelligence if approached. As Kuczynski knew Fuchs well, he was the man chosen to approach Fuchs with the offer to spy for the Soviet Union, an offer Fuchs accepted.

In 1942 Kuczynski introduced Fuchs to his sister Ursula, who was a "star agent for the Soviet Union." She operated under the code name "Sonya" working with Fuchs to pass his atomic secrets to the Soviet Union until 1946, when Moscow broke off contact with her. Although interviewed by British intelligence, she was never put under surveillance. She was allowed to leave England for East Germany in 1950, shortly before Fuchs was tried for his activities. She considered her activities as part of fighting against fascism, not spying against the United Kingdom. She became an author, using the name Ruth Werner, by which she is often identified in the sources.

Fuchs and Sonya had met regularly in Oxfordshire, where she had moved in order to be closer to her (and Jürgen's) parents. They had relocated to the countryside from London at the start of the war. Fuchs was working nearby on the Manhattan Project, which sought to develop a nuclear weapon. The information he passed to the Soviet military via Ursula is thought to have accelerated by several years the Soviets' development of atomic weaponry in their military arsenal.

In 1942 Kuczynski was required to tell Hermann Duncker that Duncker's son had been executed, and was expected to convince the father that Soviet justice never made mistakes. Forty years later, Kucynski said he remembered this conversation as one that had caused him much heartache because of the way he had had to assert the infallibility of Stalin's policies "against his own better judgement".

In June 1943 Kuczynski founded in London the Initiative Committee for the Unification of German Emigration. Three months later, on 25 September 1943, a British section was founded of the Soviet-sponsored National Committee for a Free Germany. He remained a member of the organisation's leadership until he was succeeded by Kurt Hager in the summer of 1944.

During his time in Britain, Kuczynski was constantly watched by MI5 and the Special Branch of Scotland Yard. The Special Branch described him in May 1944 as the "economic expert of the German Communist Party who has been known to us as a Communist since June 1931, when he was employed by the Communist Central Organisation in Berlin. In 1932, he was one of the supporters of the World Anti-War Congress Movement, which was organised by Willi Münzenberg on behalf of the Third International". MI5 in a report described him: "Kuzcynski does not usually overestimate possibilities and indulge in wishful thinking like most Communists are prone to".

In mid-1944 Kuczynski was approached by Joe Gould, a colonel in the US Office of Strategic Services, to help recruit German exiles willing to parachute into Germany for surveillance and resistance work. Kuczynski referred Gould to the London branch of the KPD, and German communist exiles were chosen for the task. (He shared these details with his sister Ursula and therefore with the Soviet Union, as described in Joseph E. Persico's Piercing the Reich: The Penetration of Nazi Germany by American Secret Agents During World War II.)

Based on his recent publications on the German economy, in September 1944 Kuczynski was invited to join the Strategic Bombing Survey; he was given the rank of lieutenant colonel in the US Army Air Force. As an intelligence analyst, his task was to evaluate the impact of American bombing upon the German economy, and to suggest how the Americans might better bomb Germany to damage the economy of the Reich. Kuczynski worked under the economist John Kenneth Galbraith. He shared this analysis with the GRU.

== Return to Germany ==
At the end of the war, Kuczynski returned to Germany as a lieutenant colonel in the US Army. He had been directed by the Strategic Bombing Survey to acquire important documentation on German armaments production. As a senior US officer, he arrested Schmitz. As the chief executive officer of IG Farben, Schmitz was a high-profile war-crimes suspect at the time.

As a senior US officer, Kuczynski was first based in the American sector of what later became widely known as West Berlin. But in July 1945, the chief of the Soviet Military Administration in the Soviet occupation zone appointed him as President of the Finance Administration in what later became known as East Germany. Marshal Zhukov was a busy man. Kuczynski learned of his appointment from the Berlin Radio station while traveling back to London. In 1945 he settled in his parents' home which was located in the American sector of Berlin.

In 1947, the year in which his father died in Oxford, Kuczynski renounced his British citizenship (gained during the war). He intended to make his permanent home in Germany.

== Postwar life in East Germany ==
In 1946 he had been appointed to the teaching chair for Economic History at Berlin University. He was in charge there of the Institute for Economic History until 1956.

On 30 June 1947 he was elected as the first Chairman of the Society for the Study of Soviet Culture (forerunner of the Society for German–Soviet Friendship). He reportedly said to its members, "He who hates and despises human progress as it is manifested in the Soviet Union is himself odious and contemptible." Between 1949 and 1958, Kuczynski also sat as a member of the Volkskammer, which was the country's national legislature. In 1950, he moved to East Berlin, leaving his family home in West Berlin, after Fuchs was arrested in Britain in December 1949, which led to his fears that he might soon be arrested as well.

The SED directed him to cultural and academic activities. He was one of East Germany's most prominent and productive academics. During his lifetime he published approximately 4,000 pieces of writing. (Sources differ over the estimated total.) In 1955 he was founder and chief of the Economic History Department at the German Academy of Sciences, in addition to the Institute of Economic History. Both were communist fronts. Kuczynski's sister Renate noted that because of his bildungsbürgerlich values that he always believed that as long as works of high culture were made available to the masses that he assumed this must mean that their characters were being improved, and for Kuyzynski the really important thing was the East German state were publishing the classics of world literature in cheap paperback copies. Fair-Schulze wrote: "Kuczynski's Marxism was deeply intertwined with German cultural history and a specifically German bildungsbürgerlich project of modernity...Thus their Marxism was by nature far more inclusive and open-ended than what evolved as official Marxism-Leninism within the Soviet dominion...Intellectuals like Kuczynski were culturally tied to the mental world of first and second generation Marxism".

His public lectures were very popular. As a senior member of the country's "revolutionary aristocracy", he was permitted greater freedom to criticize the regime than was allowed to others. Kuczynski always wrote from a Marxist perspective, but many of his writings differed significantly from the official line, for an example he sometimes criticized Vladimir Lenin, saying he had made mistakes, which was normally taboo in East Germany. In 1956, Kuczynski triggered a major intellectual controversy with an article about historical objectivity in the journal Zeitschrift für Geschtswissenschaft. Kuczynski began his argument by saying that Marxist historians must reject the "bourgeois pseudo-concept of 'objectivity'", criticizing scholars such as Leopold von Ranke and Max Weber for hiding their bias behind the façade of objectivity and concluding "...in reality, scientists cannot, did not, and must not avoid taking a stand". Kuczynski argued that all scholarly writing is "partisan" as everyone has a bias in some way, but that: "The development of historical science demands rather a specific type of partisanship. It demands partisanship for progress; at the beginning of the 19th century, for capitalism and the bourgeoise; today, partisanship for the socialism and the working class. It demands partisanship for the new and progressive, to which society advances. To be partisan for reality-that is the literal meaning of the word objectivity...That trait consists of the fact, that in the process of social motion is a process of development, not an anarchic or circular motion...but a progressive movement, from the lower to higher stages of society. It is a law-governed and elemental process." In this way, Kuczynski argued that reality itself was "partisan" and that whatever intellectuals wrote was always grounded upon the particular stage of "progress" a society was at in any given moment of time.

However, he qualified his thesis that to be "partisan" for the "new and progressive" must be "scientific" and grounded in reality. Despite his criticism of Ranke, Kuczynski paid him a back-handed tribute as he wrote: "No doubt, Ranke uses the new instrument in the interests of the ruling classes...But how much closer we have come in technical terms to an adequate understanding of the past through Ranke!...Any means however that help us to understand reality better... are of importance to social progress". This thesis that objective "scientific" methods of research can be useful for understanding reality provided that they are directed towards the proper (Marxist) ends put him outside of the mainstream of Marxist historiography in the German Democratic Republic. Likewise, despite his criticism of Weber, Kuczynski largely accepted Weber's notion of history as a science which is verifiable and universal as Weber famously argued that what is truth for a German social scientist should also be truth for a Chinese social scientist provided that they can both verify the same phenomena via the scientific methods. Kuczynski wrote: "Our demand for partisanship in historiography is a postulate, which is the indispensable condition of any scientific research on society whatsoever. It is impossible to develop an adequate attitude to the reality of social development, without taking sides with the new and progressive produced by that reality. The demand for partisanship that we make today, is therefore nothing else but the demand for realistic objectivity". Despite his express rejection of Weber's approach, Kuczynski's view of social sciences was very similar with the main difference being that Weber anchored his views in the logic and rationality of science itself while Kuczynski anchored his view in the progressive development of society based on Marxism as he contended that everyone would take a view based on how far advanced a given society was at any moment. Much of the controversy caused by Kuczynski's article in East Germany centered around his implicit claim that historians should be guided by Marxism, but in a manner that was "realistic objective", which very strongly implied intellectual freedom to write in a manner that was "realistic objective" instead of being dictated to by the regime. Kuczynski was calling for freedom of expression at least for those scholars writing from a Marxist perspective. Kuczynski's article led him to be subjected to a lengthy series of disciplinary hearings in 1956–58, in which he was criticized for advancing a thesis that was not "partisan" enough for the SED regime.

In 1957, he published the book Der Ausbuch des ersten Weltkriegs und die deutsche Sozialdemokratie, in which he claimed that not only the majority of the Social Democrats had supported the German government in World War I, but also the majority of the working class, an interpretation of history that was entirely against the official line in East Germany. Even more controversially Kuczynski defended the decision of Karl Liebknecht, the leader of the left wing of the Social Democrats, to initially support the war and to vote for war credits in the Reichstag. The officially Marxist SPD had long promised to call a general strike to shut down the German economy if the German government should go to war, but in August 1914 the majority of the SPD leaders had instead supported the government, accepting the claim of the government that Russia was about to invade Germany, and hence it was the patriotic duty of the SPD to support the government. This decision split the SPD into the Majority Social Democrats who supported the war and the Independent Social Democrats who were opposed. The KPD had its origins in the latter faction, and the official line in German communist historiography had always been was that the Majority Social Democrats had "betrayed" the working class by supporting the war. Kuczynski by arguing that the majority of the German working class had supported the Majority Social Democrats and that the Independent Social Democrats were a marginal movement in August 1914 was challenging the founding legend of German Communism, hence the vehement reaction his book generated in East Germany. Even more infuriating to the East German regime, Kuczynski argued that the SPD in August 1914 was not a Leninist party, and could not had called the promised general strike to stop the war even if they had wanted to. A key counter-factual assumption to the founding legend of German Communism was that if only the SPD had called the promised general strike in August 1914, then World War One would have been stopped and millions of would have been lives saved, so Kuczynski's claim that the SPD could not have stopped World War I was especially distasteful to the SED regime.

In West Germany, Kuczynski's book was ignored as the general view of him was that he was a "red terrorist" as Gerhard Ritter called him. In East Germany, Kuczynski's book had challenged the orthodox view of what had happened in August 1914 provoked immense controversy and led to vigorous attempts by other East German historians to defend the Leninist line. In Neues Deutschland, the official newspaper of the SED, a harsh review of Kuczynski's book was published by Albert Schreiner, accusing him of "revisionist" beliefs and of promoting "a false view of the relationship between leftists and centrists in the workers' movement" in August 1914. In the (East) German Academy of Sciences, Kuczynski was subjected to sustained campaign by senior and junior faculty to retract his book and publicly apologize for writing it, causing him to be ostracized when he refused. On 27 February 1958, Der Ausbuch des ersten Weltkriegs und die deutsche Sozialdemokratie was in effect banned as it was announced that bookstores would no longer be allowed to sell it. In March 1958, Einheit, the official journal of the SED, published a very negative view of Der Ausbuch des ersten Weltkriegs und die deutsche Sozialdemokratie by Rudolf Lindau which accused Kuczynski of "a strange predilection" for the enemies of Marxism such as the "revisionist" Karl Kautsky, the "anarchist" Franz Pfemfert and the "Trotskyist" Paul Frölich. For a time in 1958, Kuczynski's career was in serious danger of being ended as his book had very much displeasured the East German regime.

Kuczynski's friend, the philosopher Ernst Bloch, had been fired from his faculty position for differing from the party line and he himself believed that there was a serious chance of him likewise being fired. Victor Klemperer wrote in his diary on 14 February 1958 that he believed there was "a second Bloch case in the offering", even through he had agreed with what Kuczynski had written. The fact that Kuczynski came from an upper middle-class Jewish family and had spent the Nazi years in exile in Britain instead of the Soviet Union were additional factors against him. Kuczynski was threatened with being fired from the Academy of Sciences and with being expelled from the SED if he did not retract his book as he was warned that Kurt Hager, the SED's secretary for science and culture, wanted to see him punished. On 2 March 1958 in a speech before the Third University Teachers' Conference with Hager being present, Kuczynski partially retracted what he had written, saying he had made mistakes, through he also expressly rejected the charge of "revisionism". Kuczynski was also saved by the fact that his book had submitted in advance to the censors before he had published it, and it was felt to be embarrassing for the regime to punish an author for publishing a book that had gone through its very strict censorship process.

As Kuczynski reached and passed retirement age, he continued to occupy a range of important advisory posts and memberships. Above all he continued to write prodigiously. He claimed to be a dissenter of the party line. He was discovered by a new generation of readers with his book entitled Dialogue with my great grandson (1983, "Dialog mit meinem Urenkel"). It was widely read in East Germany during the 1980s, and Kuczynski was criticised for it by Socialist Unity Party of Germany. In Dialog mit meinem Urenkel, Kuczynski addressed the question of Stalinism, writing: "If you would ask me if I was happy as a comrade and a scholar in the 'time of Stalin', I can only answer: Yes! Yes! For I was convinced of the greatness and intelligence of Stalin, and did not feel oppressed in my scholarly work, let alone repressed. But don't forget that the effects of Stalinism were slighter in our Party than in the Soviet Union. Our conditions-think of the multi-party system-made the worse crimes impossible, as did the influence of several Party comrades". The scholar John Connolly wrote that there was an element of truth to Kuczynski's account as Stalin did not regard East Germany as permanent and in 1952 offered to allow German reunification provided Germany was neutral, which made establishing "full socialism" undesirable. Connolly wrote that Kuczynski was correct that the East Germany did not have the same "monster show trials" that the other "people's democracies" in Eastern Europe did in the late 1940s-early 1950s, but he ignored that about 2% of the East German population were the victims of government repression, of whom one-tenth died as a result. In Dialog mit meinem Urenkel, Kuczynski did admit to shame over some of his actions in the Stalinist period.

He never lost the confidence of East German leader Erich Honecker, for whom he frequently worked as a speech writer. And he never lost his Marxist faith: unlike some members of the East German establishment, he continued to celebrate the German Democratic Republic. He also supported the Party of Democratic Socialism (which inherited the mantle of the SED) in his writing, long after the reunification of 1989/90 had opened up the dark side of the old one-party dictatorship to wider and deeper scrutiny.

== Family ==
Jürgen Kuczynski married Marguerite Steinfeld, an economist and translator, in 1928. The couple had three recorded children, Thomas, Peter and Madeleine.

Thomas, like his father, became an economic historian and university lecturer. Peter, an expert on American civilisation, worked for many years at the Martin Luther University of Halle-Wittenberg.

== Library ==
As an eldest son of a bookish family, Jürgen Kuczynski inherited many books. The collection included works from the eighteenth century, and he greatly added to it. His "great grandfather's grandfather" had been an admirer of Immanuel Kant, and had purchased a number of first editions by the Königsberg philosopher. He also owned an early edition of the Communist Manifesto (a pirate edition printed in 1851), which a more recent ancestor had picked up on a trip to Paris. When Kuczynski's father, Robert René Kuczynski, had fled to England in 1934, he had to leave much of the collection behind, where it was lost in the war. He shipped 20,000 books to England.

By the time Jürgen Kuczynski died, he had inherited these books and added to the collection, accumulating a valuable private library of approximately 70,000 books and journals. Kuczynski's library was taken over in 2003 by the Berlin Central and Regional Library. It is held in the library's historical collection. It is believed to take up "approximately 100 meters of shelf space".

== Kuczynski and Stalinism ==
Kuczynski was frequently identified with Stalinism during the dictator's period in power. After Stalin died, his successor Nikita Khrushchev made a speech to party leaders On the Cult of Personality and Its Consequences, denouncing the abusive excesses of the regime. After this became public, Stalinists were pressured to change their positions.

But Kuczynski believed that "Stalinism" embraced the entire body of developments over a period of three decades, and included both positive and negative results. In the 1950s and 60s, Kuczynski rejected the new denunciation of Stalin as a "continuation of Stalinism" ("Fortsetzung des Stalinismus"). His own argument would have appealed to the leadership of the German Democratic Republic. Viewing the world through his prism of Economic History, Kuczynski noted two major achievements under Stalin: rapid industrialization with the creation of a large heavy industrial sector across rural Russia, and the defeat of Nazi Germany.

Kuczynski thought that Stalin had enjoyed the trust of the Soviet people. He said that the personality cult and the speeches provided the people and the soldiers with moral strength. He did note that Stalin had abused this trust through his purges and brutal dictatorship. He believed that the dictator's talents as a propagandist made him successful in imposing dogmas and killing off dialectically objective controversy. He seemed to ignore the role in state terror in suppressing opposition.

== Awards and honours ==
- 1949 National Prize of East Germany
- 1964 Banner of Labor
- 1969 Order of Karl Marx
- 1974 National Prize of East Germany
- 1979 Star of People's Friendship
- 1984 Patriotic Order of Merit
- 1989 Patriotic Order of Merit Gold clasp

Kuczynski was nominated three times for the Nobel Prize in Economics, but he never won it.

Since 2007 some supporters have proposed renaming the southern part of the Antonplatz ("Anton Square"), in Berlin's Weißensee quarter, as "Jürgen-Kuczynski-Platz". Numerous local residents oppose this idea, but in 2014, proponents were still pushing it.

== Published works ==
Jürgen Kuczynski produced approximately 4,000 published pieces of writing, mostly articles but also numerous books; some sources give higher estimates. Some of these works were written jointly with others, and the figure appears to include his contributions to academic and other journals. He estimated that roughly 100 were books or substantial pamphlets ("etwa 100 Bücher oder stärkere Broschüren").

Mario Keßler has listed the six most important as follows:

=== Principal academic works ===
- Geschichte der Lage der Arbeiter unter dem Kapitalismus (40 volumes)
- Studien zur Geschichte der Gesellschaftswissenschaften (10 volumes)
- Geschichte des Alltags des deutschen Volkes (5 volumes) ISBN 3-89438-191-4

=== Works intended for a wider audience ===
- A Short History of Labour Conditions Under Industrial Capitalism in the United States of America: 1789-1946
- A Short History of Labour Conditions in France: 1700 to the Present Day
- Jürgen Kuczynski: Dialog mit meinem Urenkel. 19 Briefe und ein Tagebuch. 2nd edition Berlin 1984

(republished in an uncensored edition in 1997, with black margin markings highlighting the sections that were excluded in previous editions)

- Jürgen Kuczynski: Fortgesetzter Dialog mit meinem Urenkel: Fünfzig Fragen an einen unverbesserlichen Urgroßvater. Berlin 2000
- Jürgen Kuczynski: Ein treuer Rebell. Memoiren 1994–1997. Berlin 1998

A number of Kuczyn's writings were translated into English, such as The Rise of the Working Class.

Kuczynski frequently contributed to the weekly arts and politics magazine Die Weltbühne.

== Books and articles ==
- Connolly, John (2009). "The Paradox of East German Communism: From Non-Stalinism to Neo-Stalinism". In Tismaneanu, Vladimar (ed.). Stalinism Revisited: The Establishment of Communist Regimes in East-Central Europe. BudapestL: Central European Press. pp. 161–191. ISBN 978-9639776630.
- Fair-Schulze, Axel (2011). "Jürgen Kuczynski: A German-Jewish Marxist scholar in exile". In Fair-Schulz, Axel; Kessler, Mario (eds.). German Scholars in Exile: New Studies in Intellectual History. LanhamL: Lexington Books. pp. 137–159. ISBN 978-0739150481.
- Feldner, Heiko (2002). "History in the Academy: objectivity and partisanship in the Marxist Historiography of the German Democratic Republic". In Major, Patrick; Osmond, Jonathan (eds.). The Workers' and Peasants' State: Communism and Society in East Germany Under Ulbricht 1945-71. Manchester: Manchester University Press. pp. 262–279. ISBN 0719062896.
- Polmar, Norman; Allen, Thomas (1998). The Spy Book The Encyclopedia of Espionage. New York: Random House. ISBN 0-375-70249-0.
- Reid, James (1990). Writing Without Taboos: The New East German Literature. Oxford: Berg Publishers. ISBN 0854960201.<
- Stibbe, Mathew (2010). "Fighting the First World War in the Cold War: East and West German Historiography on the Origins of World War One, 1949-1959". In Hochscherf, Tobias; Laucht, Christoph; Plowman, Andrew (eds.). Divided, But Not Disconnected: German Experiences of the Cold War. Oxford: Berghahn Books. pp. 34–49. ISBN 978-1845456467.
- Stibbe, Mathew (February 2011). "Jürgen Kuczynski and the Search for a (Non-Existent) Western Spy Ring in the East German Communist Party in 1953". Contemporary European History. 20 (1): 61–79. doi:10.1017/S0960777310000378. S2CID 159895569.
