= Lothar Berthold =

German politician, historian and publisher (1926–2007)

- Born: August 30, 1926; Hindenburg, Upper Silesia, Germany
- Died: 12 September 2007 (aged 81); Berlin, Germany
- Education: Friedrich Schiller University, Jena
- Occupations: historian university teacher publisher author/propagandist
- Political party: Party of Democratic Socialism; Socialist Unity Party of Germany (1946-1989); Communist Party of Germany (1946); Nazi Party
- Spouse: Erika _____
- Children: 3, including Erika-Dorothea Berthold
- Awards: Star of People's Friendship, in silver (1986); National Prize of the German Democratic Republic, 1st Class (1979); Banner of Labor, 2nd Class (1976); National Prize of the German Democratic Republic, 1st Class (1966); Patriotic Order of Merit, in silver (1965); Patriotic Order of Merit, in bronze (1963)

Lothar Berthold (30 August 1926 – 12 September 2007) was an East German Marxist-Leninist historian, university teacher and publisher. He was also an official of the country's ruling Socialist Unity Party ("Sozialistische Einheitspartei Deutschlands" / SED). During the 1960s he was a member of the politburo's "Ideology Commission", widely regarded as one of the most committed and effective propagandists among East Germany's mainstream academic historians. His publications and political engagement after reunification reflected a continuing commitment to East German-style communism.

== Life ==
Berthold was born in Hindenburg (as Zabrze had been renamed) after 1914). Hindenburg was a substantial manufacturing city in Upper Silesia: the 1921 plebiscite had identified it as a predominantly German-speaking city, albeit by a narrow margin. Lothar Berthold's father worked as a customs official. After completing his school final exams (Abitur) at a relatively young age, in 1943/44 he became a Luftwaffenhelfer (loosely: "air defence assistant"). In 1944 he was enrolled into the Reich Labour Service. Before the end of the year he had been conscripted into the army. He was briefly a member of the Nazi Party. By the time the war ended, in May 1945, he had already been promoted to a junior officer rank.

The ending of the war brought industrial scale ethnic cleansing to Silesia followed by frontier changes. Berthold found himself relocated to the central portion of Germany, administered now as the Soviet occupation zone. Communist Party membership was no longer outlawed, and early in 1946 he became a youthful member of the re-emerging Communist Party of Germany. He was actively involved in the contentious party merger which led, in April 1946, to the launch of the Socialist Unity Party ("Sozialistische Einheitspartei Deutschlands" / SED), quickly signing his party membership over to the newly united – albeit effective as such only in the Soviet zone – "party of the left". Comrades attest that it was as a result of the education reforms in the emerging communist German state that he was able, almost immediately, to enroll at the Friedrich Schiller University at Jena where he studied History, German studies and Philosophy between 1946 and 1950, emerging with a degree and a Level I teaching qualification.

In October 1949 the Soviet occupation zone had been relaunched as the Soviet sponsored German Democratic Republic (East Germany), seen by critics as a new kind of German one-party dictatorship, with the SED as its ruling party. Berthold worked between 1950 and 1952 as a research assistant at the party's Karl Marx Academy, located at that time just outside Berlin. The focus of his work was on the history of the German labour movement and, more specifically, on the development of the Communist Party in Germany. In 1952 he added a teaching position at the academy to his research work. He received his doctorate in 1955 for a piece of work (subsequently published as a book) on Communist Party history. In 1960 he passed his habilitation (higher academic qualification) which opened the way to a lifelong academic career. The same year he was appointed to a professorship at the academy.

In 1962 he was appointed to as position at the Party Central Committee's Institute for Marxism–Leninism, initially as head of the Department for the History of the Labour Movement. He also served, between 1962 and 1964, as a deputy president of the institute. He was promoted in 1964, becoming the institute's president in succession to Roland Bauer. Along with this position, which Berthold held for the next four years, he was appointed a member of the politburo's influential "Ideology Commission". Along with his responsibilities at the institute, between 1962 and 1968 Berthold was editor in chief of "Beiträge zur Geschichte der Arbeiterbewegung", an academic journal focusing on the history of the labour movement, a topic of considerable importance for the national leadership.

In 1967 the eldest of the Bertholds' three daughters, Erika-Dorothea, became friendly with Florian Havemann, whose father, Robert Havemann was one of the country's most high-profile (and intellectually brilliant) political dissidents. The crushing of the Prague Spring movement in August 1968 through an invasion by fraternal tanks from around the Warsaw Pact caused unease at many levels in East Germany, but most people kept their doubts to themselves. Nevertheless, a number of young people, including some of the adolescent children of East German intellectuals, such as Thomas Brasch, Florian Havemann and his girl-friend, Erika-Dorothea Berthold, expressed their opposition to the Warsaw Pact intervention through a series of street protests in Berlin. They also painted the name "Dubcek" on walls and distributed leaflets spelling out their concerns. After slightly less than three months in investigatory custody, the young people faced trial between 21 and 28 October 1968 and were condemned to prison terms or, in the case of Florian Havemann who was only 16, "educational measures". In November 1968 those sentenced to prison terms were released on probation because, it was reported, they had displayed "remorseful insight" ("reuevolle Einsicht"). Erika-Dorothea Berthold was nonetheless prevented from completing her schooling. She was already living with her boy-friend in a commune and was now, despite her stellar academic pedigree, required to train for work as a librarian. Lothar and Erika Berthold (Erika-Dorothea's mother) were appalled. The shock was all the greater because of the prominent part in the protest played by the eldest daughter of a committed academic member of the "Ideology Commission". By the end of 1968 Lothar Berthold, as the young protester's father, had been obliged to resign not merely from the commission but also from the presidency of the Institute for Marxism–Leninism and "associated functions".

Lothar Berthold won the Patriotic Order of Merit in bronze in 1963 and then, after just two years, in silver. A normal progression during the next ten or so years would have been to the gold version of the same award. That never happened, but he did win other – possibly less prestigious – awards from the government over the next couple of decades, and it soon became apparent that removal from the Institute for Marxism–Leninism would not mark the end of his academic career. Between 1969 and 1972 he was employed as an academic research assistant at the Central Institute for History of the (East) German Academy of Sciences and Humanities in central Berlin. Between 1972 and 1976 he served as the institute's deputy director. In 1976 he took over from Werner Mussler as a director of the Akademie Verlag, which was the publishing house affiliated with the academy. He held core operational responsibilities as the publisher's director for printing and publishing. He also served, between 1979 and 1990, as director of the Weimar based business "Hermann Böhlaus Nachfolger" publishing operation which had, in effect, functioned as a subsidiary of the Akademie Verlag since becoming cut off from its Vienna holding company by the so-called "Iron Curtain".

In 1990, the year when social and political changes led first to the end of East Germany's forty year Soviet-style dictatorship and then to reunification, Lothar Berthold retired on health grounds, stepping down from all his functions. He does indeed appear to have been in poor and declining health during the years that followed. He nevertheless worked actively with the "Marxist working group on the history of the German labour movement" ("Marxistische Arbeitskreis zur Geschichte der deutschen Arbeiterbewegung") which functioned under the auspices of Party of Democratic Socialism (PDS), which was emerging as a new formulation, for a democratic Germany, of East Germany's old Socialist Unity Party (SED), which itself was by now widely (though by no means universally) discredited and disparaged. In the context of the working group he co-organised various conferences. He also continued to contribute written works to various left-wing and communist journals.

== Works ==
Between 1963 and 1966 Lothar Berthold served as secretary to the authors' collective, mandated to compile and produce an eight-volume history of the German labour movement. The importance of the project is apparent from the identity of the man leading the project, Walter Ulbricht, better known then as now, for his position as the First Party Secretary – the national leader – than as a scholar of history. It was, therefore, not just as an administrator but also as a compiler-editor and author that Berthold operated at the heart of the party's propaganda structure.

Berthold wrote a two-volume biography of Ernst Thälmann, the hardline Stalinist leader of the Communist Party between 1925 and 1933, who was killed by the Nazis after spending eleven years in solitary confinement. Comrades attributed great political value to the biography, seen as a reason why Berthold won the National Prize of the German Democratic Republic not once but twice. He was also active for many years as a "Friend of the Ernst Thälmann Memorial Centre" (im "Freundeskreis der Ernst-Thälmann-Gedenkstätte") and a regular speaker at events held in the Sporthaus Ziegenhals where Thälmann held the last meeting of the Communist Party before the Nazis closed down political pluralism back in 1933.

=== Output (selection) ===
- Das Programm der KPD zur nationalen und sozialen Befreiung des deutschen Volkes vom August 1930 (in German), Berlin, 1956
- as editor-compiler (1970), Unbewältigte Vergangenheit (in German), Berlin
- Ernst Thälmann (in German), Berlin, 1979
- Geschichtskalender (in German), Berlin, 1998, 955631343

== Awards and honours ==
- 1966 and 1979 National Prize of the German Democratic Republic 1st class
- 1963 Patriotic Order of Merit in Bronze
- 1965 Patriotic Order of Merit in Silver
- 1976 Banner of Labor 2nd class
- 1986 Star of People's Friendship in Silver
