= Hans Mottek =

Hans Mottek (26 September 1910, Posen – 24 October 1993, Berlin) was one of the most important economic historians of the DDR (East Germany).

== Life ==
Mottek was born into a Jewish family and received a humanistic education. From 1929 to 1932, he studied jurisprudence at the universities of Freiburg and Berlin. In 1932/33 he was a legal clerk at the Amtsgericht Bernau bei Berlin. After the Nazi seizure of power, Mottek had to abandon the professional career which he had only just begun. In the same year, he emigrated to Mandatory Palestine. In 1935, Mottek joined the Communist Party of Germany. Subsequently, he lived in Great Britain from 1936 to 1946, where he made his living as an agricultural worker. There he was a founding member of the Free German Youth.

In 1946 he returned to Germany and became a jurist in the central administration for labour and social welfare in Berlin. From 1947 he expanded into the field of academia as an economic historian and he achieved his doctorate in 1950 at the University of Berlin for his dissertation, Die Ursachen der preußischen Eisenbahnverstaatlichung des Jahres 1879 und die Vorbedingungen ihres Erfolges [The Causes of the Prussian Railway Nationalisation of 1879 and the Preconditions for its Success].

His first post at the paedogogical high school of Greater Berlin was followed in autumn 1950 by an appointment at the newly founded Hochschule für Ökonomie Berlin (HfÖ) in Karlshorst in the seminar for economic history (later the Institute of Economic History), where he remained for four years and established his own school of economic history. In 1951, he became a docent, then an ordinary professor in 1952. After that, from 1952 until his retirement in 1975, he was director of the Institute of Economic History at the HfÖ.

He became a corresponding member of the German Academy of Sciences at Berlin (AdW) in 1969 and an ordinary member in 1971. From 1971 until 1974 he was the leader of the commission for environmental research at the AdW.

== Work ==
Between 1957 and 1974 Mottek's masterpiece, the three volume Wirtschaftgeschichte Deutschlands [Economic History of Germany] was produced in close connection with his teaching. This foundation stone of the study of German economic history quickly found recognition in Germany and internationally.

Mottek passed his special interest in the industrialisation of the 19th century to his students, who produced several works on the history of the industrial revolution in Germany, with his encouragement and direction. Among these scholars were Lothar Baar, Walter Becker and Horst Blumberg.

Mottek researched and wrote particularly on the problem of economic crises, on stagnation and growth in economic history and on means of accelerating economic growth in the past and present.

Mottek, who never abandoned Marxism, entered a new field (for the DDR) in the 1970s: the research of issues of the relationship between humanity and the environment. He no longer produced research in other fields of economic history in the face of his growing concern with the global problems of humanity and its future in the face of impending ecological catastrophe.

== Awards ==
- Patriotic Order of Merit in Silver (1960), in Gold (1975), Honour Clasp in Gold (1985)
- National Prize of the German Democratic Republic, 3rd class for scholarship and technology (1968)
- Ehrendoktor of the HfÖ Berlin (1970)

== Publications ==
Monographs

- Die Ursachen der preußischen Eisenbahnverstaatlichung des Jahres 1879 und die Vorbedingungen ihres Erfolges (The Causes of the Prussian Railway Nationalisation of 1879 and the Preconditions for its Success). Berlin 1950 (Diss.).
- Wirtschaftsgeschichte Deutschlands. Ein Grundriss (Economic History of German: A Foundation).
  - Volume 1: Von den Anfängen bis zur Zeit der Französischen Revolution (From the Beginnings until the Time of the French Revolution). Deutscher Verlag der Wissenschaften, Berlin 1957 (6th edition, 1983).
  - Volume 2: Von der Zeit der Französischen Revolution bis zur Zeit der Bismarkschen Reichsgründung (From the Time of the French Revolution until the Time of the Foundation of the German Empire by Bismarck). Deutscher Verlag der Wissenschaften, Berlin 1964 (3rd edition 1987).
  - Volume 3: Von der Zeit der Bismarckschen Reichsgründung 1871 bis zur Niederlage des faschistischen deutschen Imperialismus 1945 (From the Time of the Foundation of the German Empire by Bismarck in 1871 until the Defeat of Fascist German Imperialism in 1945) (with Walter Becker and Alfred Schröter). Deutscher Verlag der Wissenschaften, Berlin 1974 (3rd edition, 1977).
- Gesellschaft und Umwelt (Society and Environment). Akademie-Verlag, Berlin 1976.
- Theoretisch-historische Betrachtungen zum Problem der ökonomischen Krisen im Kapitalismus (Theoretical-Historical Reflections on the Problem of Economic Crises in Capitalism). Akademie-Verlag, Berlin 1978.
- Die Krisen und die Entwicklung des Kapitalismus (The Crises and the Development of Capitalism). Akademie-Verlag, Berlin 1982.
- Zu den Entwicklungsgesetzmäßigkeiten des kapitalistischen Geldsystems (On the Laws of the Development of the Capitalist Monetary System). Akademie-Verlag, Berlin 1982.
- Die 70er Jahre (The 70's). Akademie-Verlag, Berlin 1984.
- Entwicklungstendenzen der staatsmonopolistischen Regulierung nach dem Zweiten Weltkrieg (Development Trends of State-Monopolistic Regulation since the Second World War). Akademie-Verlag, Berlin 1988.
- Wirtschaftsgeschichte und Umwelt (Economic History and the Environment). BdWi-Verlag, Marburg 1996.
- (Ed.): Studien zur Geschichte der industriellen Revolution in Deutschland (Studies on the History of the Industrial Revolution in Germany). Akademie-Verlag, Berlin 1960 (2nd edition, 1975).

Articles (selection)

- "Zum Problem Stagnation und Wachstum in der Wirtschaftsgeschichte." (On the Problem of Stagnation and Growth in Economic History) Jahrbuch für Wirtschaftsgeschichte (1969/III), pp. 151–170.
- "Zu einigen Grundfragen der Mensch-Umwelt-Problematik." (On Some Fundamental Questions on the Relationship between Humanity and the Environment) Wirtschaftswissenschaften 20 (1972), pp. 36–42.
- "Wirtschaftsgeschichte und Umwelt." (Economic History and Environment) Jahrbuch für Wirtschaftsgeschichte (1974/II), pp. 77–82.

== Bibliography ==
- "Mottek, Hans." In: Collegium Politicum an der Universität Hamburg. Arbeitsgruppe Historiographie (Ed.): Geschichtswissenschaftler in Mitteldeutschland. Ferd. Dümmlers Verlag, Bonn, Hannover, Hamburg, München 1965, p. 69.
- Ilko-Sascha Kowalczuk: Mottek, Hans. In: Wer war wer in der DDR? 5. Ausgabe. Band 2, Ch. Links, Berlin 2010, ISBN 978-3-86153-561-4.
- Lothar Baar, "In memoriam Prof. Dr. Dr. h. c. Hans Mottek" (PDF; 379 kB). Jahrbuch für Wirtschaftsgeschichte (1994/I), pp. 215f.
